= Vehicle registration plates of Ontario =

Licence plates of Ontario, Canada

Ontario
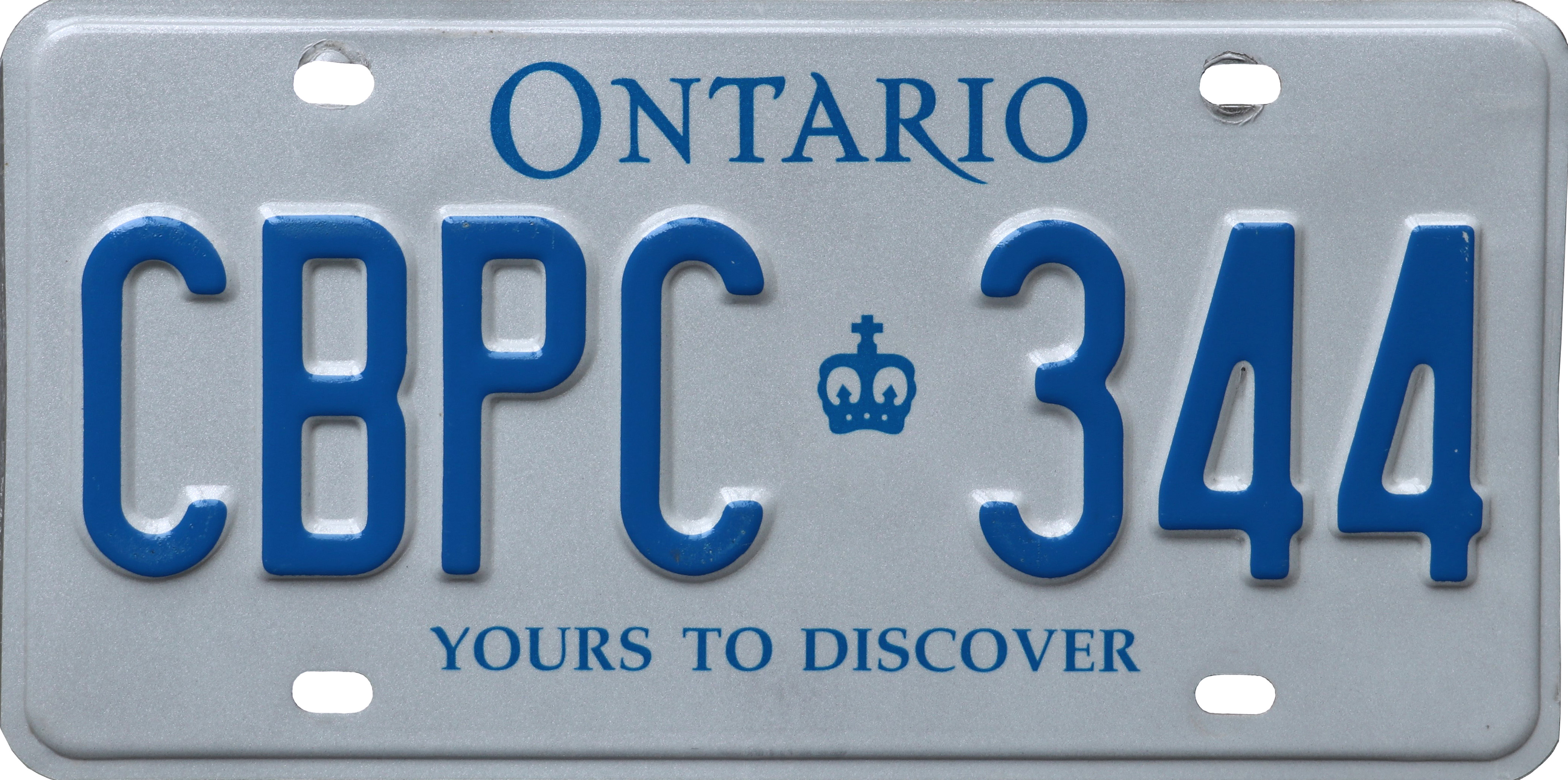

Current series
- Slogan: Yours to discover/Tant à découvrir (Note: Vehicular license plates may be ordered with the slogan in either the English or French language. The slogan is omitted on green vehicle license plates issued by the province.)
- Size: 12 in × 6 in 30 cm × 15 cm
- Material: Aluminum
- Serial format: ABCD-123
- Introduced: 1997 (reissued in 2020)

Availability
- Issued by: Ministry of Transportation
- Manufactured by: Trilcor Industries; Milton, Ontario, Canada

History
- First issued: 1911 (pre-provincial plates from 1903 to 1911)

The Canadian province of Ontario first required its residents to register their motor vehicles in 1903. Registrants provided their own licence plates for display until 1911, when the province began to issue plates. Plates are currently issued by the Ministry of Transportation (MTO). The location of plates is specified by the Highway Traffic Act and Regulation 628 under the Act.

== The Crown ==
The symbol of a crown representing the Crown of Canada has appeared on almost all Ontario licence plates since 1937, when it was first used to commemorate the coronation of King George VI and Queen Elizabeth. Exceptions to this included a series of licence plates issued from 1951 to 1952, due to metal shortages from the Korean War; and a series of farm plates issued in the 1980s and 1990s.

Toronto politician and Orange Order leader Leslie Saunders led protests against a proposal to remove the crown in 1948, a decision the government overturned.

== Passenger baseplates ==
=== 1911 to 1972 ===
In 1956, Canada, the United States, and Mexico came to an agreement with the American Association of Motor Vehicle Administrators, the Automobile Manufacturers Association and the National Safety Council that standardized the size for licence plates for vehicles (except those for motorcycles) at 6 inches (15 cm) in height by 12 inches (30 cm) in width, with standardized mounting holes. The 1954 (dated 1955) issue was the first Ontario licence plate that complied with these standards.

Image	Dates issued	Design	Slogan	Serial format	Serials issued	Notes
	1911	White serial on blue porcelain plate; vertical "ONT." and "1911" at left and right respectively	none	12345	1 to approximately 11500	
	1912	Black serial on white flat metal plate; provincial coat of arms and "ONT 1912" at left	none	12345	1 to approximately 16500	
	1913	Black serial on yellow flat metal plate; provincial coat of arms and "ONT 1913" at left	none	12345	1 to approximately 24000	
	1914	Black serial on tan flat metal plate; provincial coat of arms and "ONT 1914" at left	none	12345	1 to approximately 33000	
	1915	Dark blue serial on light green flat metal plate; provincial coat of arms and "ONT 1915" at left	none	12345	1 to approximately 43000	
	1916	Black serial on white flat metal plate; provincial coat of arms and "ONT 1916" at left	none	12345	1 to approximately 64000	
	1917	Black serial on white flat metal plate; provincial coat of arms and "ONT 1917" at right	none	12345	1 to approximately 78000	
	1918	Dark blue serial on white flat metal plate; provincial coat of arms and "ONT 1918" at left	none	123456	1 to approximately 107000	
	1919	Black serial on golden yellow flat metal plate; provincial coat of arms and "ONT 1919" at left	none	123456	1 to approximately 133000	
	1920	Dark green serial on white flat metal plate; provincial coat of arms and "ONT 1920" at left	none	123456	1 to approximately 162000	
	1921	Embossed orange serial on black plate with border line; "ONT 21" at left	none	123-456	1 to approximately 184–000	First embossed plate.
	1922	Embossed black serial on white plate with border line; "ONT 22" at left	none	123-456	1 to approximately 216–000	
	1923	Embossed white serial on black plate; "ONT–1923" at bottom	none	123-456	1 to approximately 260–000	
	1924	Embossed black serial on golden yellow plate; "ONT–1924" at bottom	none	123-456	1 to approximately 313–000	
	1925	Embossed yellow serial on black plate with border line; "ONT 25" at left	none	123-456	1 to approximately 309–000	
	1926	Embossed black serial on grey plate with border line; "ONT 26" at left	none	123-456	1 to approximately 415–000	
	1927	Embossed black serial on buff plate with border line; "ONTARIO 1927" at bottom	none	123·456	1 to approximately 437·000	First use of the full province name.
	1928	Embossed black serial on yellow plate with border line; "ONTARIO 1928" at bottom	none	123·456	1 to approximately 446·000	
	1929	Embossed black serial on grey plate with border line; "ONTARIO 1929" at bottom	none	123·456	1 to approximately 477·000	
	1930	Embossed black serial on white plate with border line; "ONTARIO 1930" at bottom	none	A-1234	A-1 to Z-9999	Letters G, I and Q not used in serials; this practice continued through 1936.
	1930	Embossed black serial on white plate with border line; "ONTARIO 1930" at bottom	none	AB-123	AA-1 to approximately PV-999	Letters G, I and Q not used in serials; this practice continued through 1936.
	1931	Embossed black serial on yellow plate; "ONTARIO 1931" at top	none	A·1234	A·1 to Z·9999	
	1931	Embossed black serial on yellow plate; "ONTARIO 1931" at top	none	AB·123	AA·1 to approximately OT·999	
	1932	Embossed black serial on grey plate; "ONTARIO 1932" at top	none	A·1234	A·1 to Z·9999	
	1932	Embossed black serial on grey plate; "ONTARIO 1932" at top	none	AB·123	AA·1 to approximately OB·999	
	1933	Embossed black serial on yellow plate; "ONTARIO 1933" at top	none	A·1234	A·1 to Z·9999	
	1933	Embossed black serial on yellow plate; "ONTARIO 1933" at top	none	AB·123	AA·1 to approximately MZ·999	
	1934	Embossed black serial on white plate; "ONTARIO 1934" at top	none	A·1234	A·1 to Z·9999	
	1934	Embossed black serial on white plate; "ONTARIO 1934" at top	none	AB·123	AA·1 to approximately NA·999	
	1935	Embossed black serial on orange plate; "19 ONTARIO 35" at top	none	A·1234	A·1 to Z·9999	
	1935	Embossed black serial on orange plate; "19 ONTARIO 35" at top	none	AB·123	AA·1 to approximately OK·999	
	1936	Embossed white serial on black plate; "19 ONTARIO 36" at bottom	none	A·1234	A·1 to Z·9999	
	1936	Embossed white serial on black plate; "19 ONTARIO 36" at bottom	none	AB·123	AA·1 to approximately PK·999	
	1937	Embossed white serial on red plate; "ONTARIO 1937" centred at top, with crowns to left and right	none	1·A·234; 12·A·34; 123·A·4		First base to feature a crown in any form. Letters G, I, O and Q not used in serials; this practice continued through 1953.
	1938	Embossed orange serial on light blue plate; "19", crown and "38" centred at top; "ONTARIO" centred at bottom	none	1A234; 12A34; 123A4		Colours commemorate the Loyal True Blue and Orange Home.
	1939	Embossed white serial on black plate; "19", crown and "39" centred at top; "ONTARIO" centred at bottom	none	1A234; 12A34; 123A4; A1234		
	1940	Embossed black serial on yellow plate; "ONTARIO", crown and "1940" at top	none	1A234; 12A34; 123A4; A1234		
	1941	Embossed green serial on white plate; "ONTARIO", crown and "1941" at top	none	1A234; 12A34; 123A4; A1234		
	1942	Embossed black serial on orange plate; "ONTARIO", crown and "1942" at top	none	1A234; 12A34; 123A4; A1234		
	1943–44	Embossed orange serial on black plate; "ONTARIO", crown and "1943" at top	none	1A234; 12A34; 123A4; A1234		Revalidated for 1944 with windshield stickers, due to metal conservation for World War II.
	1945	Embossed white serial on blue plate; "ONTARIO", crown and "1945" at top	none	1A234; 12A34; 123A4; A1234		
	1946	Embossed white serial on black plate; "ONTARIO", crown and "1946" at top	none	1A234; 12A34; 123A4; A1234		
	1947	Embossed black serial on silver plate; "ONTARIO", crown and "1947" at top	none	1A234; 12A34; 123A4; A1234		
	1948	Embossed white serial on blue plate; "ONTARIO", crown and "1948" at top	none	1A234; 12A34; 123A4; A1234		
	1949	Embossed blue serial on white plate; "ONTARIO", crown and "1949" at top	none	1A234; 12A34; 123A4; A1234; 1234A		
	1950	Embossed white serial on black plate; "ONTARIO", crown and "1950" at top	none	1A234; 12A34; 123A4; A1234; 1234A		
	1951–52	Embossed blue serial on white plate; "19–ONTARIO–51" at top	none	1A234; 12A34; 123A4; A1234; 1234A; AB123		Revalidated for 1952 with windshield stickers.
	1953	Embossed white serial on blue plate; "ONTARIO", crown and "1953" at top	none	1A234; 12A34; 123A4; A1234; 1234A; AB123		
	1954	Embossed blue serial on white plate; "ONTARIO", crown and "1954" at top	none	1A234; 12A34; 123A4; A1234; 1234A; AB123		
	1955	As 1953 base, but with "1955" to right of crown	none	123·456; A12·345		First 6" x 12" plate.
	1956	As 1954 base, but with "1956" to right of crown	none	123·456; A·12345		
	1957	Embossed white serial on black plate; "ONTARIO", crown and "1957" at top	none	123·456; A·12345		
	1958	Embossed black serial on white plate; "ONTARIO", crown and "1958" at top	none	123·456; A·12345		
	1959	As 1957 base, but with "1959" to right of crown	none	123·456; A·12345		
	1960	As 1958 base, but with "1960" to right of crown	none	123·456; A·12345		
	1961	As 1957 base, but with "1961" to right of crown	none	123·456; A·12345		
	1962	As 1958 base, but with border line, and with "1962" to right of crown	none	123·456; A·12345		
	1963	As 1957 base, but with border line, and with "1963" to right of crown	none	123·456; A·12345		
	1964	As 1958 base, but with border line, and with "1964" to right of crown	none	123·456; A·12345		
	1965	Embossed white serial on blue plate with border line; "ONTARIO", crown and "1965" at top	none	123·456; A·12345; 12345·A		
	1966	Embossed blue serial on white plate with border line; "ONTARIO", crown and "1966" at top	none	123·456; A·12345; 12345·A		
	1967	Embossed white serial with crown separator on blue plate with border line; "19 ONTARIO 67" at top	"18 CONFEDERATION 67" at bottom	123-456; A12-345; 123-45A		Issued as part of the Canadian Centennial celebration.
	1968	Embossed blue serial with crown separator on white plate with border line; "1968" and "ONTARIO" centred at top and bottom respectively	none	123-456; A12-345; 123-45A		
	1969	Embossed white serial with crown separator on blue plate with border line; "1969" and "ONTARIO" centred at top and bottom respectively	none	123-456; A12-345; 123-45A		
	1970	As 1968 base, but with "1970" at top	none	123-456; A12-345; 123-45A		
	1971	As 1969 base, but with "1971" at top	none	123-456; A12-345; 123-45A		
	1972	As 1968 base, but with "1972" at top	none	123-456; A12-345; 123-45A		

=== 1973 to present ===
After 1973, Ontario ceased to issue plates annually. Instead, validation was indicated by means of stickers affixed to the top right of the rear plate. All Ontario license plates issued since 1973 remain valid for display.

In 1973, the "Keep it Beautiful" slogan was introduced to Ontario passenger plates. In 1982, the slogan was changed to "Yours to Discover". The adjustment was made to reflect the province's new tourism campaign.

In April 2019, the Government of Ontario announced that the plates would be redesigned. The plates' design includes a superficial laminate layer manufactured by 3M. The plates have a two-tone blue background with white letters and numbers flanking a stylized white trillium, and no longer embossed. The motto was also changed to "A Place to Grow", taking inspiration from Ontario's unofficial anthem "A Place to Stand, a Place to Grow".

Issue of the new plates began in February 2020. The new plates faced criticism from law enforcement agencies, as their new design made them difficult to read in certain lighting conditions. Concerns were also raised that photo radar systems would have difficulty reading them, due to the lighting issues, as well as the smaller sizing of their "Ontario" text. On February 20, 2020, Premier Doug Ford stated that the government planned to recall the initial batch, and was working with 3M on improvements. However, on May 6, 2020, a spokesperson for Ford announced that the blue plates would be discontinued entirely after "thorough testing by law enforcement and other key stakeholders". The previous white plates were reinstated, with their coating also made more durable, although the blue plates continued to be issued through early-June until their supply was exhausted.

Image	Dates issued	Design	Slogan	Serial format	Serials issued	Notes
	1973–78	Embossed blue serial with crown separator on white plate with border line; "ONTARIO" centred at top; "73" at bottom left and full sticker box at bottom right	"KEEP IT BEAUTIFUL" centred at bottom	ABC-123	AAA-001 to NKJ-999	Letters G, I and Q not used in this serial format, and U discontinued after the LMU series (1976).
	1978–82	As above, but without "73", and with partial sticker box at bottom right	"KEEP IT BEAUTIFUL" centred at bottom	ABC-123	NKK-001 to TMA-999	
	1982–86	As above, but with no sticker box	"YOURS TO DISCOVER" centred at bottom	ABC-123	TMB-001 to ZZZ-999	Staggered registration introduced 1983, with each plate expiring in the same month as the registrant's birthday.
	1986–94	As above, but with no sticker box	"YOURS TO DISCOVER" centred at bottom	123-ABC	001-AAA to 999-VYH	Letters G, I, Q and U not used in this serial format.
	1994–97	Blue on reflective white with screened crown separator; "ONTARIO" screened in blue centred at top	"YOURS TO DISCOVER" screened in blue centred at bottom	123-ABC	001-VYJ to 999-ZZZ	Narrower serial dies introduced in preparation for ABCD-123 format, and O discontinued after the ZZO series (1997).
	1997–2020; 2020–present	Blue on reflective white with screened crown separator; "ONTARIO" screened in blue centred at top	"YOURS TO DISCOVER" screened in blue centred at bottom	ABCD-123	AAAA-001 to CLZZ-999; CPAA-001 to DLPH-458 (as of June 21, 2026)	Letters G, I, O, Q and U not used in this serial format. Font had slightly changed from CASA-001 to CATR-999.
	2008–20; 2020–present	Blue on reflective white with screened crown separator; "ONTARIO" screened in blue centred at top	"TANT À DÉCOUVRIR" screened in blue centred at bottom	ABCD-123	FAAA-001 to FABF-787 (as of November 1, 2025)	Alternative issue, introduced in 2008. Certain series were allocated for the French slogan: BCAA, BEAA, BEAD, BEAE, BEAJ, BEAL, BEAM, BEAN, BEAP, BEAS, BSRH, BSRJ, BSRK, BTBE, and BTBF. Exclusive use of 'F' series of serials since April 2019.
	2020	White on reflective, two-hue blue with white stylized trillium separator and white crown placed bottom right; "Ontario" screened in white centred at top. Plates are made of synthetic material and are not embossed.	"A PLACE TO GROW" screened in white centred at bottom.	ABCD-123	CMAA-001 to CMMZ-349 (as of July 9, 2020)	The initial batch of these plates issued from February 1, 2020, to March 4, 2020, were recalled due to poor visibility at night when illuminated. This design was later scrapped on May 6, 2020.
	2020	White on reflective, two-hue blue with white stylized trillium separator and white crown placed bottom right; "Ontario" screened in white centred at top. Plates are made of synthetic material and are not embossed.	"EN PLEIN ESSOR" screened in white centred at bottom	ABCD-123	FAAE-000 to FAAM-000	Alternative issue.

=== Serial numbers reserved for government officials ===
Serial(s)	Political Office of Holder(s)	Level of Government
CAN-001	Prime Minister of Canada	Federal
CAN-002 to CAN-999	Federal Cabinet Ministers	Federal
SEN-001 to SEN-999	Members of the Senate	Federal
MHC-001 to MHC-999	Members of the House of Commons	Federal
FCJ-001 to FCJ-999	Federal Court Judges	Federal
FDA-001 to FDZ-999	Federally Owned Vehicles	Federal
ONT-001	Premier of Ontario	Provincial
ONT-002 to ONT-999	Provincial Cabinet Ministers	Provincial
MPP-001 to MPP-999	Members of Provincial Parliament	Provincial
SCO-001 to SCO-999	Ontario Superior Court of Justice	Provincial
PJO-001 to PJO-999	Ontario Provincial Judges	Provincial
ONA-001 to ONZ-999	Provincially Owned Vehicles	Provincial

=== Green vehicle plates ===
Image	First issued	Description	Slogan	Serial format	Serials issued	Notes
	2010	Green on white with graphic white trillium separator	"GREEN VEHICLE"	GVAB 123; GWAB 123	GVAA-001 to GWAS-853 (as of April 24, 2026)	Issued to electric vehicles (plug-in hybrid and battery electric) and hydrogen vehicles. Vehicles with these plates can access HOV lanes on 400-series highways regardless of the number of passengers in the vehicle. See also: government incentives for plug-in electric vehicles.
	2010	Green on white with graphic white trillium separator	"VÉHICULE ÉCOLOGIQUE"	VEAB 123	VEAA-001 to VEAC-452 (as of September 25, 2025)	Issued to electric vehicles (plug-in hybrid and battery electric) and hydrogen vehicles. Vehicles with these plates can access HOV lanes on 400-series highways regardless of the number of passengers in the vehicle. See also: government incentives for plug-in electric vehicles.

=== Historic vehicles ===
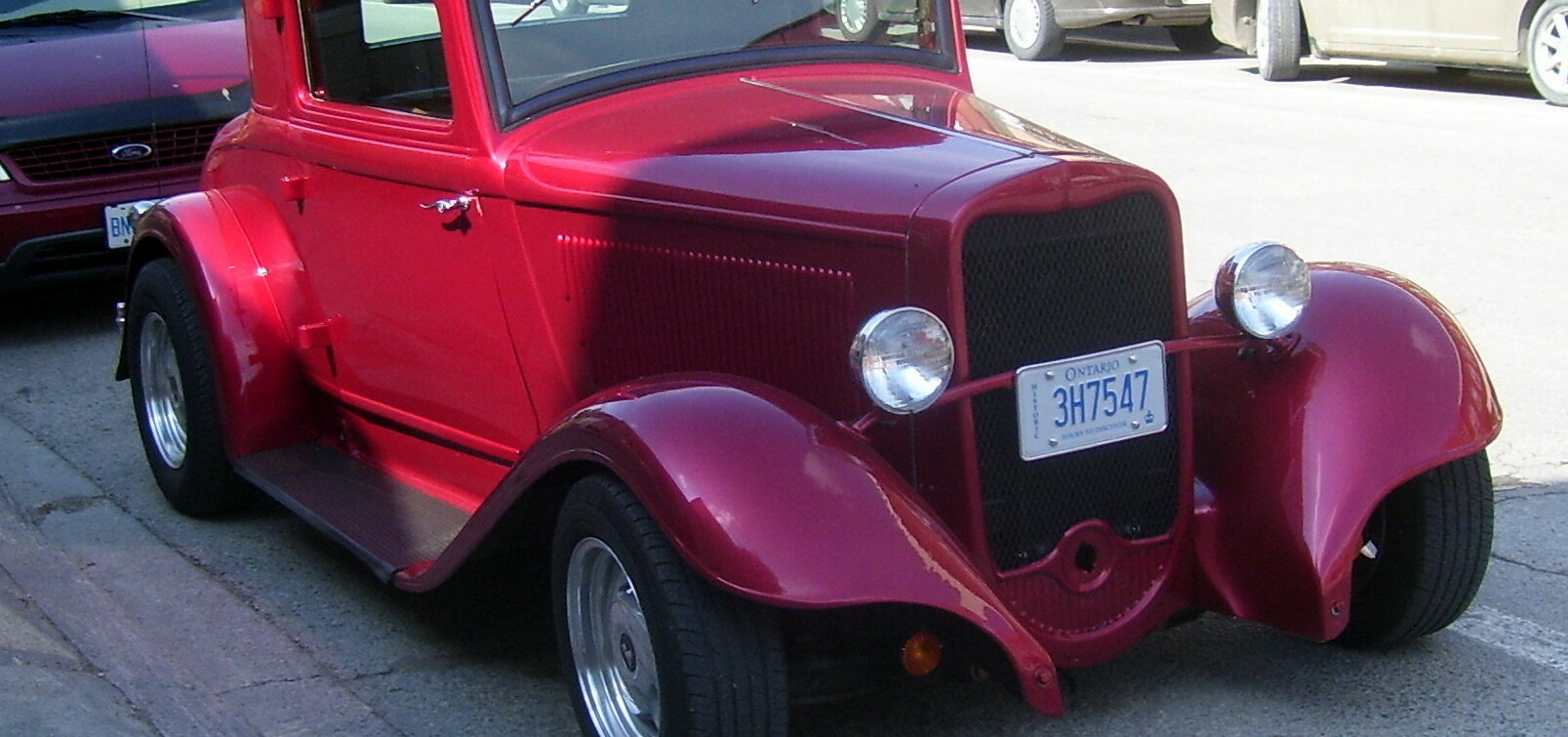
Example of an Ontario Historic plate, affixed to the front of a vehicle.

Historic vehicle licence plates were introduced in 1969 as yearly plates. In 1973, plates switched to permanently issued plates validated with stickers.

Vehicles more than 30 years old and substantially unchanged since manufacture may qualify for a "Historic" registration.

Annual fees were much lower ($18 vs $120 for a passenger car until 2022), but historic vehicles may not be used as conventional transportation. They legally may only be driven to and from events and parades where the vehicle is on display, to garages for maintenance, and other similar use cases. Annual renewal stickers are affixed to the rear plate, as with passenger vehicles.

Historic plates are not to be confused with year-of-manufacture plates.

Image	First issued	Description	Slogan	Serial format	Serials issued	Notes
	1969	White on blue plate; year centred at top, "ONTARIO" centred at bottom. "HISTORIC" "VEHICLE" screened vertically on left and right sides in red tags.	none	12 345		
	1970	Blue on white plate; year centred at top, "ONTARIO" centred at bottom. "HISTORIC" "VEHICLE" screened vertically on left and right sides in red tags.	none	12 345		
	1971	White on blue plate; year centred at top, "ONTARIO" centred at bottom. "HISTORIC" "VEHICLE" screened vertically on left and right sides in red tags.	none	12 345		
	1972	Blue on white plate; year centred at top, "ONTARIO" centred at bottom. "HISTORIC" "VEHICLE" screened vertically on left and right sides in red tags.	none	12 345		
	1973	Embossed blue serial with crown separator on white plate with border line; "ONTARIO" centred at top; "73" at bottom left and full sticker box at bottom right	"HISTORIC VEHICLE"	HVA-123		
	1978	As above, but without "73", and with partial sticker box at bottom right	"HISTORIC VEHICLE"	HVA-123		
	1982	As above, but with no sticker box	"HISTORIC VEHICLE"	HVA-123		
	1994	Blue on reflective white with screened crown separator; "ONTARIO" screened in blue centred at top. "HISTORIC" screened vertically on left side.	"YOURS TO DISCOVER"	HVA-123		
		Blue on reflective white with screened crown separator; "ONTARIO" screened in blue centred at top. "HISTORIC" screened vertically on left side.	"YOURS TO DISCOVER"	123-HVA	001-HVA to 999-HVZ	
	2007	Blue on reflective white with screened crown separator; "ONTARIO" screened in blue centred at top. "HISTORIC" screened vertically on left side.	"YOURS TO DISCOVER"	1H2345	1H0001 to 8H1165 (as of September 25, 2025)	

== Commercial baseplates ==
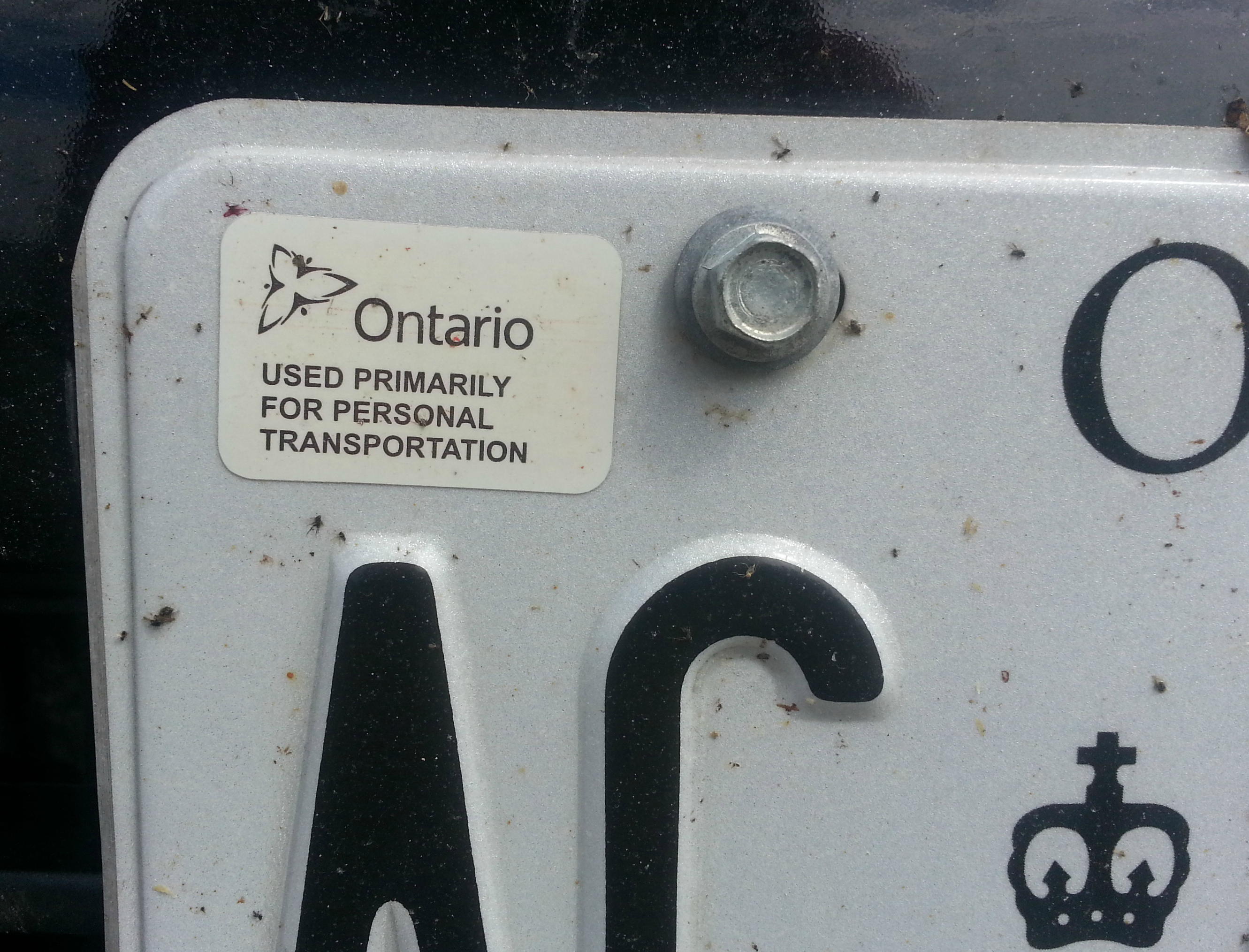
Exemption sticker

Unlike passenger cars, plate validation stickers for commercial vehicles are placed on the front plate, instead of the rear. This placement is consistent between trucks with visible rear plates, and tractor units where the rear plate is obscured by a trailer. Ontario vehicles registered in the International Registration Plan receive special commercial plates with "PRP" screened vertically at the left.

All pickup trucks are legally considered commercial vehicles and thus require commercial plates. However, if used strictly as a passenger vehicle ("personal-use vehicle"), a truck may be exempt from some conditions imposed on commercial vehicles, indicated by a white or red "PERSONAL USE ONLY" sticker affixed in the top left corner of the front plate.

=== 1916 to 1962 ===
Commercial licence plates were first introduced in 1916.

Image	First issued	Description	Serial format	Serials issued	Notes
	1916	Black serial on white flat metal plate; provincial coat of arms and "ONT 1916" at left	C1234		
	1917	Black serial on white flat metal plate; provincial coat of arms and "ONT 1917" at right	C1234		
	1918	Dark blue serial on white flat metal plate; provincial coat of arms and "ONT 1918" at left	C1234		
	1919	Black serial on golden yellow flat metal plate; provincial coat of arms and "ONT 1919" at left	C1234		
	1920	Dark green serial on white flat metal plate; provincial coat of arms and "ONT 1920" at left	C12345		
	1921	Embossed orange serial on black plate with border line; "ONT 21" at left	C1-234		
	1922	Embossed black serial on white plate with border line; "ONT 22" at left	C1-234		
	1923	Embossed white serial on black plate; "ONT–1923" at bottom	C12-345		
	1924	Embossed black serial on golden yellow plate; "ONT–1924" at bottom	C12-345		
	1925	Embossed yellow serial on black plate with border line; "ONT 25" at left	C12-345		
	1926	Embossed black serial on grey plate with border line; "ONT 26" at left	C12-345		
	1927	Embossed black serial on buff plate with border line; "ONTARIO 1927" at bottom	C12-345		
	1928	Embossed black serial on yellow plate with border line; "ONTARIO 1928" at bottom	C12-345		
	1929	Embossed black serial on grey plate with border line; "ONTARIO 1929" at bottom	C1-234		
	1930	Embossed black serial on white plate with border line; "ONTARIO 1930" at bottom	12-345C		Letter C moved to the end
	1931	Embossed black serial on yellow plate; "ONTARIO 1931" at top	12-345C		
	1932	Embossed black serial on grey plate; "ONTARIO 1932" at top	12-345C		
	1933	Embossed black serial on yellow plate; "ONTARIO 1933" at top	12345-C		
	1934	Embossed black serial on white plate; "ONTARIO 1934" at top	12345-C; C-12345		
	1935	Embossed black serial on orange plate; "19 ONTARIO 35" at top	12345-C		
	1936	Embossed white serial on black plate; "19 ONTARIO 36" at top	12345-C		
	1937	Embossed white serial on red plate; "ONTARIO 1937" centred at top, with crowns to left and right	12345-C		
	1938	Embossed orange serial on light blue plate; "19", crown and "38" centred at top; "ONTARIO" centred at bottom	12345C		
	1939	Embossed white serial on black plate; "19", crown and "39" centred at top; "ONTARIO" centred at bottom	12345C		
	1940	Embossed black serial on yellow plate; "ONTARIO", crown and "1940" at top	12345C		
	1941	Embossed green serial on white plate; "ONTARIO", crown and "1941" at top	12345C		
	1942	Embossed black serial on orange plate; "ONTARIO", crown and "1942" at top	12345C		
	1943-44	Embossed orange serial on black plate; "ONTARIO", crown and "1943" at top	12345C; C12345		Revalidated for 1944 with windshield stickers, due to metal conservation for World War II.
	1945	Embossed white serial on black plate; "ONTARIO", crown and "1946" at top	1234C; C1234		
	1946	Embossed white serial on blue plate; "ONTARIO", crown and "1945" at top	12345C; C12345		
	1947	Embossed black serial on silver plate; "ONTARIO", crown and "1947" at top	12345C; C12345		
	1948	Embossed white serial on blue plate; "ONTARIO", crown and "1948" at top	12345C; C12345		
	1949	Embossed blue serial on white plate; "ONTARIO", crown and "1949" at top	12345C; C12345		
	1950	Embossed white serial on black plate; "ONTARIO", crown and "1950" at top	12345C; C12345; 12345B		
	1951-52	Embossed blue serial on white plate; "19–ONTARIO–51" at top	12345C; C12345; 12345B		Revalidated for 1952 with windshield stickers.
	1953	Embossed white serial on blue plate; "ONTARIO", crown and "1953" at top	12345C; C12345; 12345B		
	1954	As 1953 base, but with "1955" to right of crown	12345C; C12345; 12345B		
	1955	Embossed blue serial on white plate; "ONTARIO", crown and "1954" at top	12-345A; 12-345B; 12-345C; 12-345D		
	1956	Embossed white serial on blue plate; "ONTARIO", crown and "1955" at top	12345-A; 12345-B; 12345-C; 12345-D		
	1957	Embossed white serial on black plate; "ONTARIO", crown and "1957" at top	12345-A; 12345-B; 12345-C; 12345-D		
	1958	Embossed black serial on white plate; "ONTARIO", crown and "1958" at top	12345-A; 12345-B; 12345-C; 12345-D		
	1959	Embossed white serial on black plate; "ONTARIO", crown and "1959" at top	12345-A; 12345-B; 12345-C; 12345-D		
	1960	Embossed black serial on white plate; "ONTARIO", crown and "1960" at top	12345-A; 12345-B; 12345-C; 12345-D		
	1961	Embossed white serial on black plate; "ONTARIO", crown and "1961" at top	12345-A; 12345-B; 12345-C; 12345-D		
	1962	Embossed black serial on white plate; "ONTARIO", crown and "1962" at top	12345-A; 12345-B; 12345-C; 12345-D		

=== 1963 to 1979 ===
In 1963, Ontario switched to a quarterly system for commercial plates. Plates could be issued on a quarterly basis rather than paying for a full year of registration.

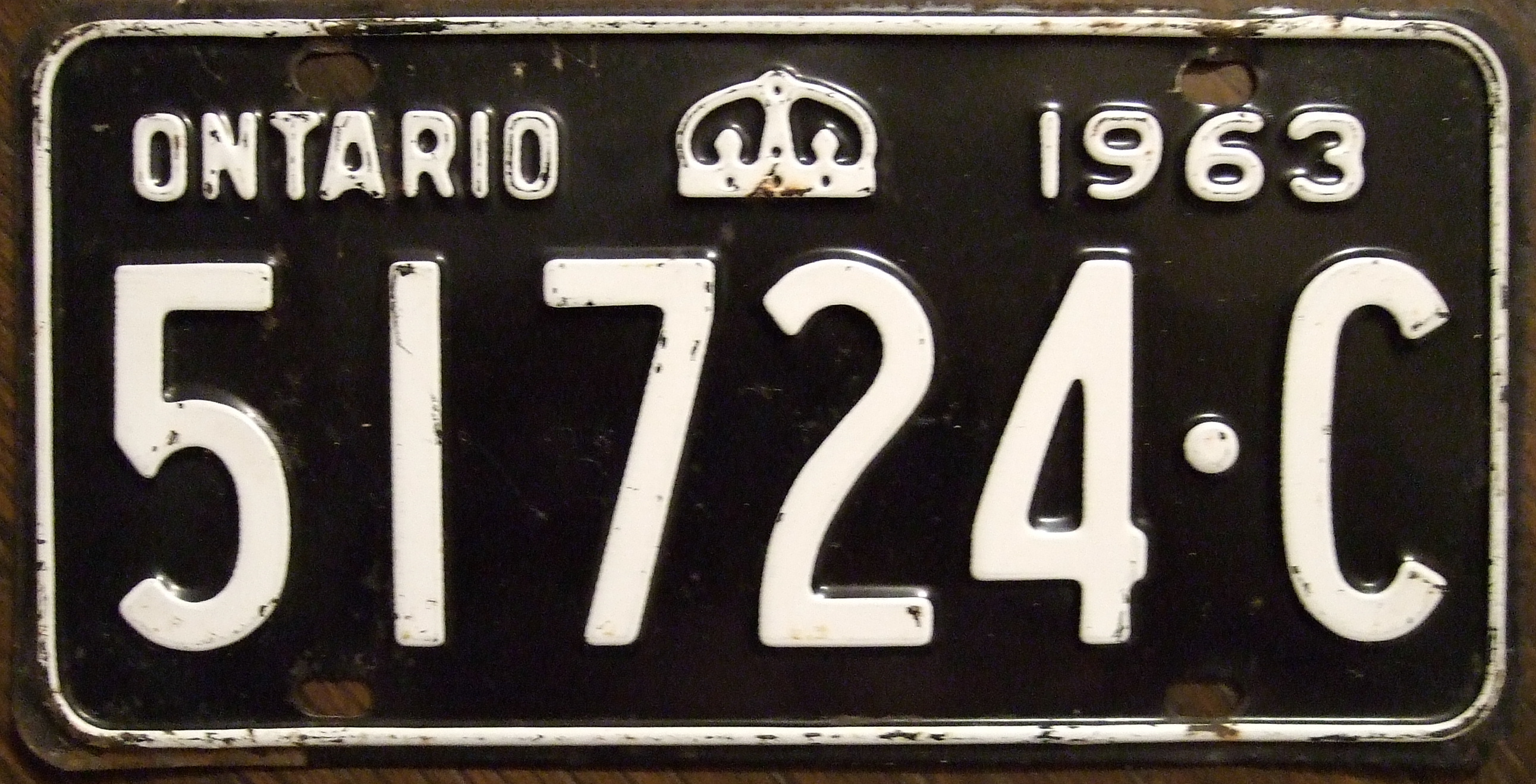
This 1963 Ontario commercial licence plate was the first quarterly plate. It expired in March 1964 and until dated March quarterly plates appeared in March 1967 this plate when issued in December 1963 was used as a quarterly commercial plate.

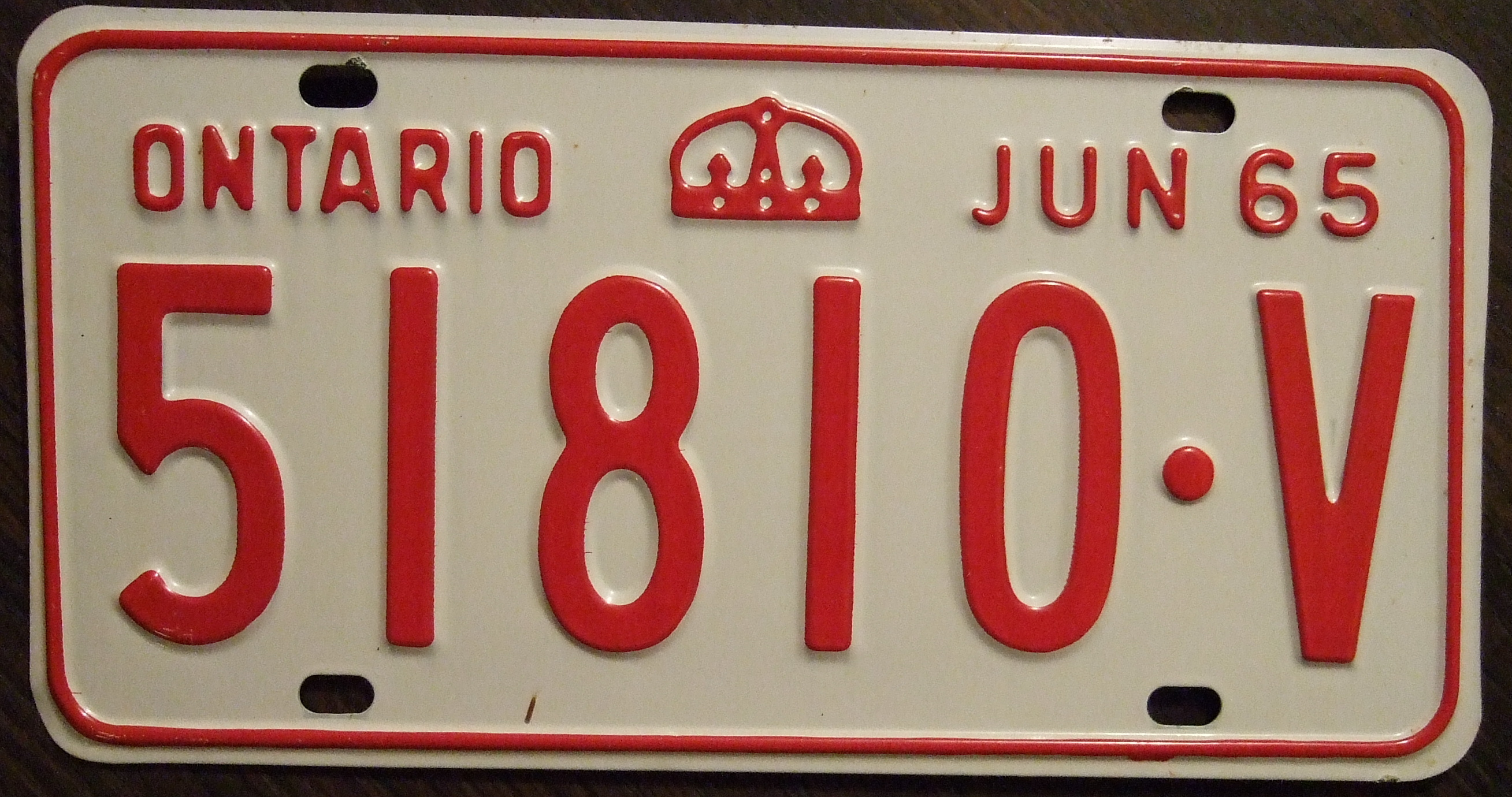
In 1965 all June, September and December quarterly plates were issued in the reverse colours as in 1963 and 1964. In alternate years Ontario quarterly plates reversed their colours each year.

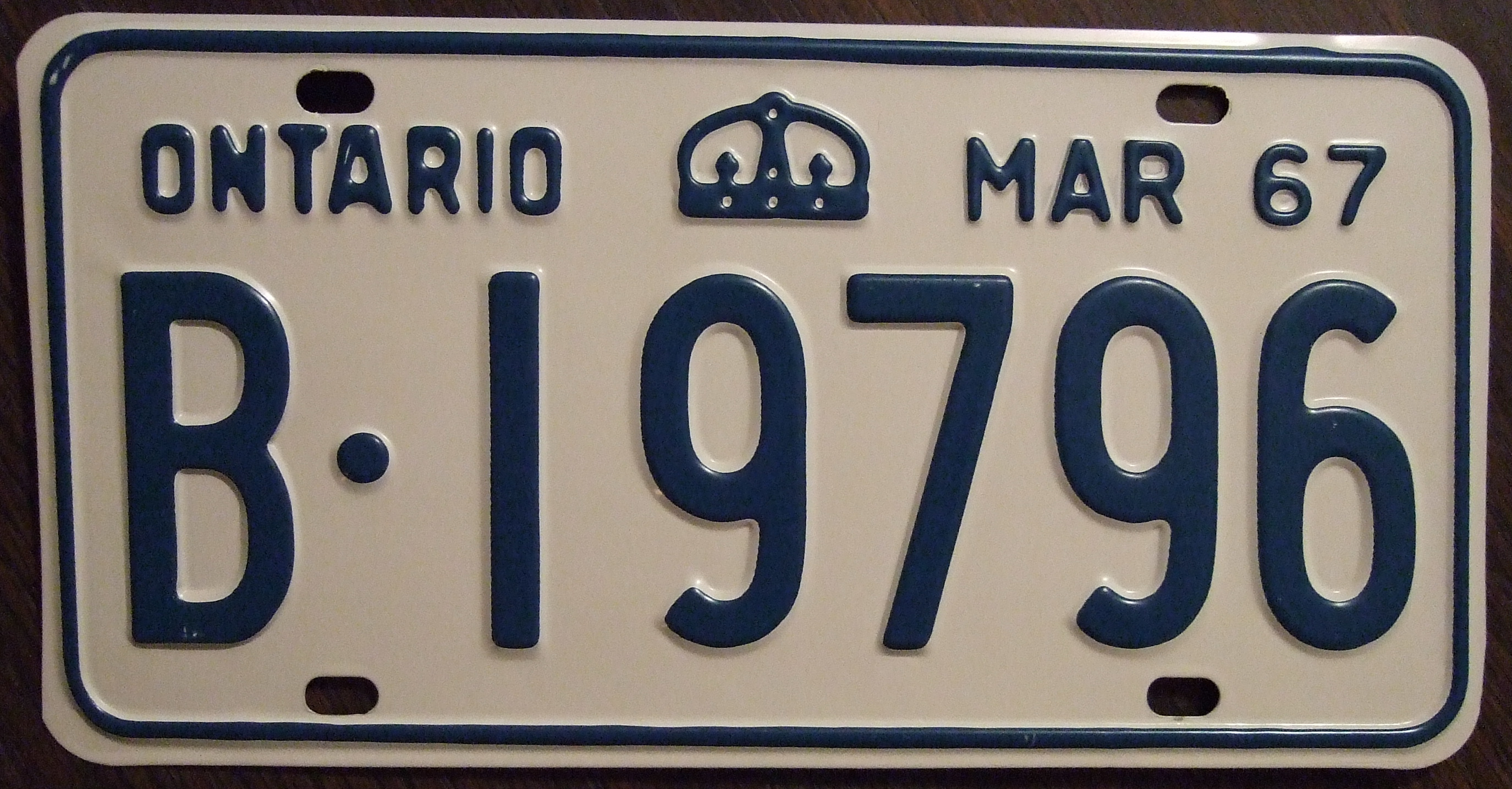
First issue of commercial quarterly plates dated for March.

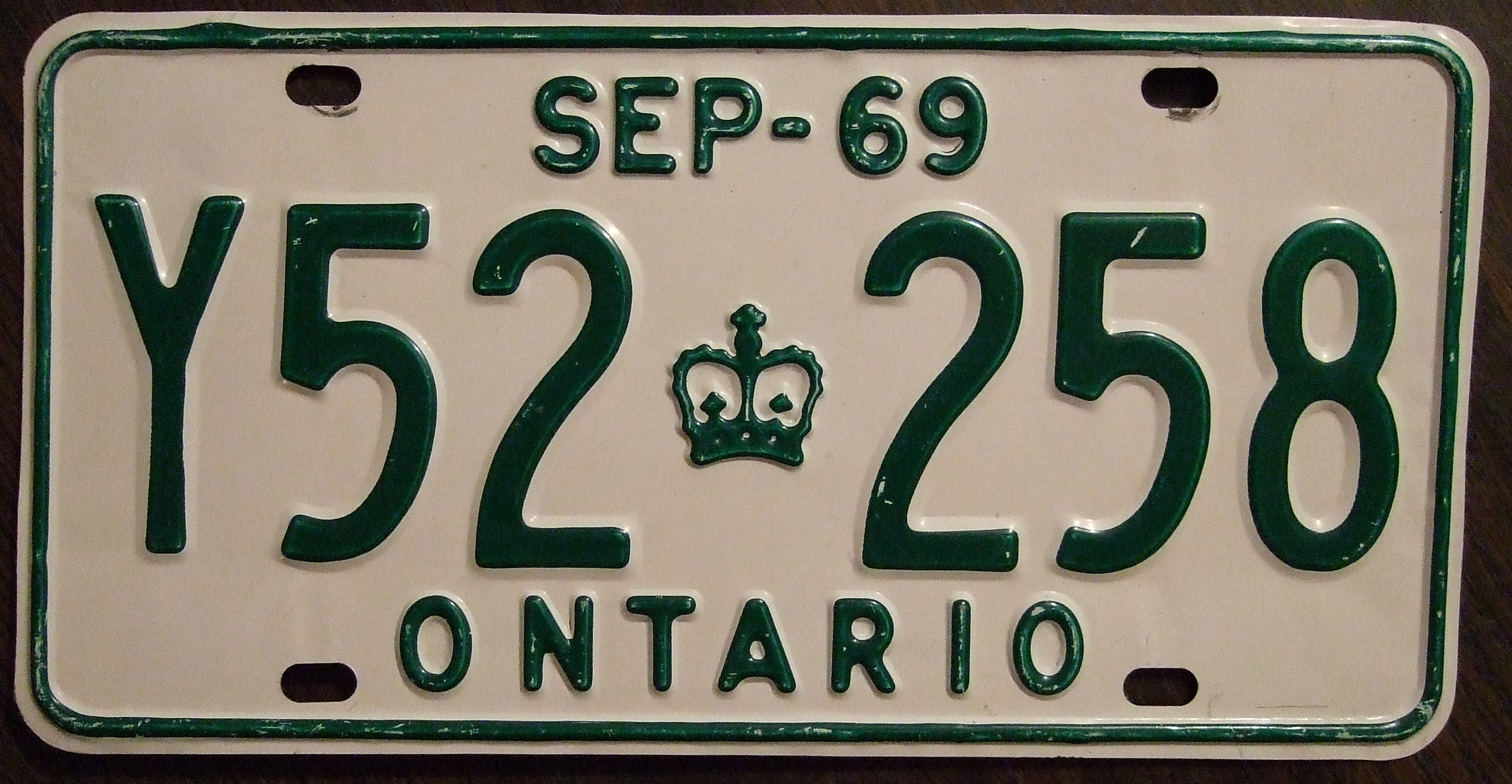
Each plate would be valid for three months or a quarter of the year. This plate was issued in June 1969 and expired in September 1969.

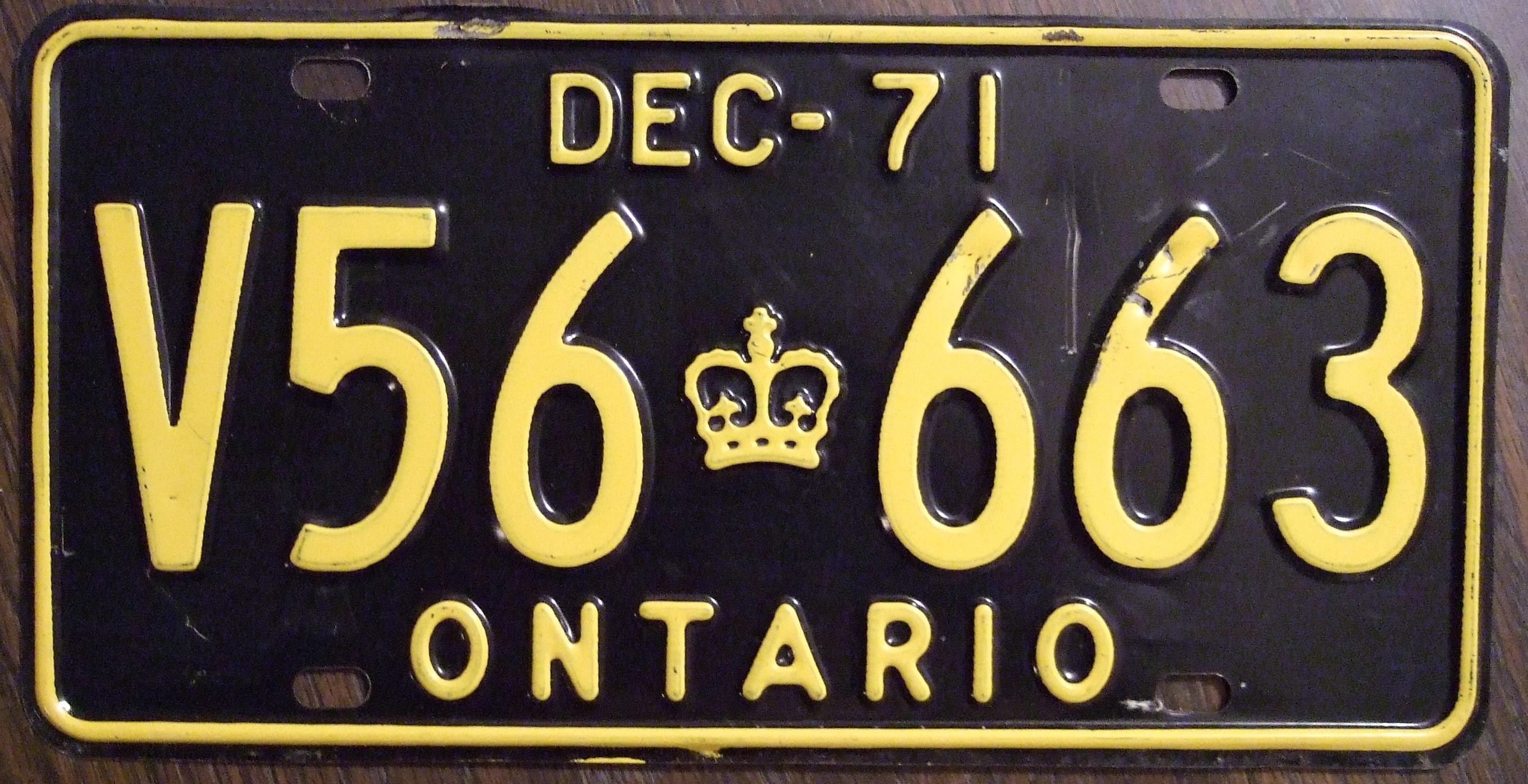
Quarterly plates had several serial format arrangements. Beginning in March 1968 they switched to the A1-234, 123-4A and A12-345 & 123-45A formats.

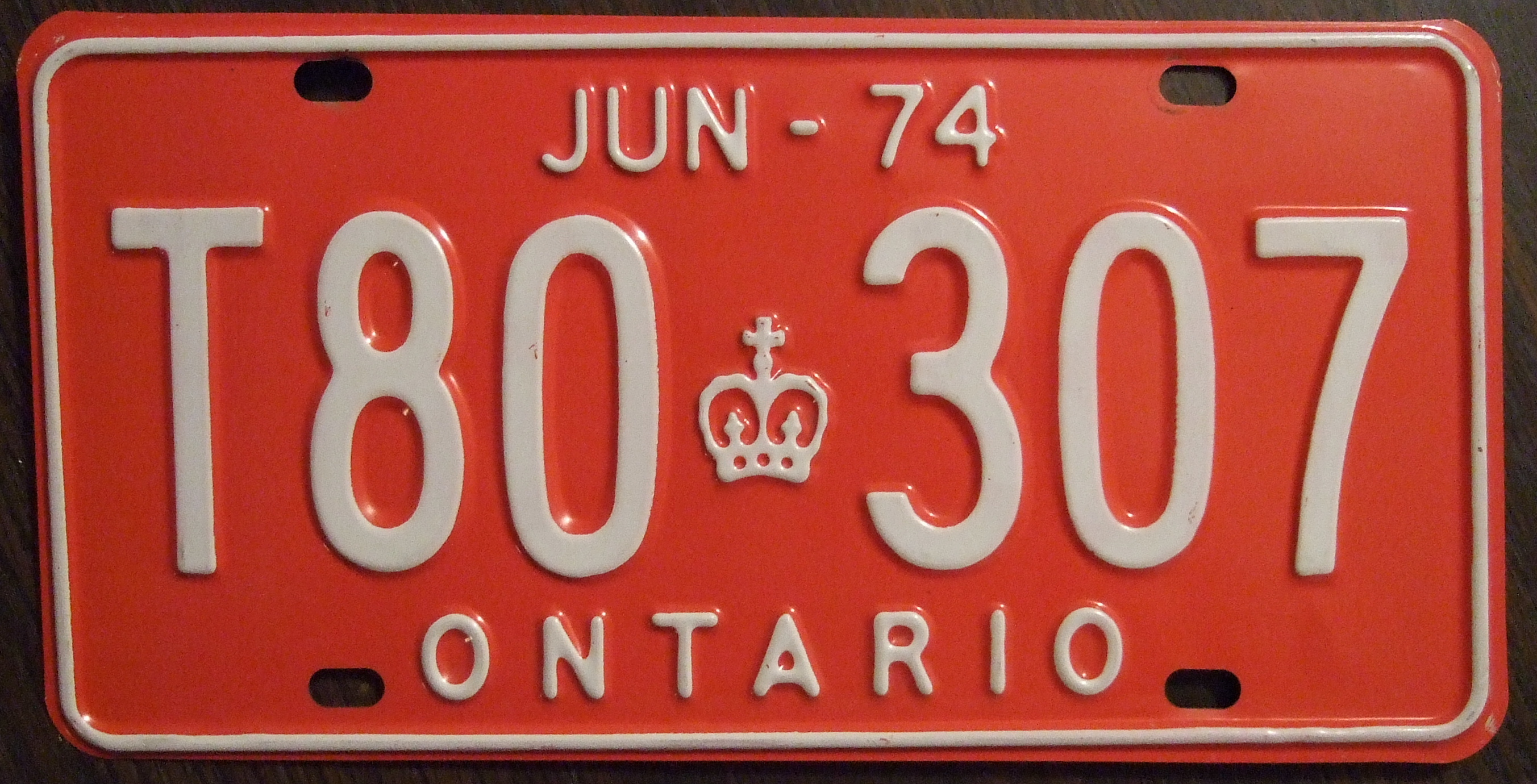

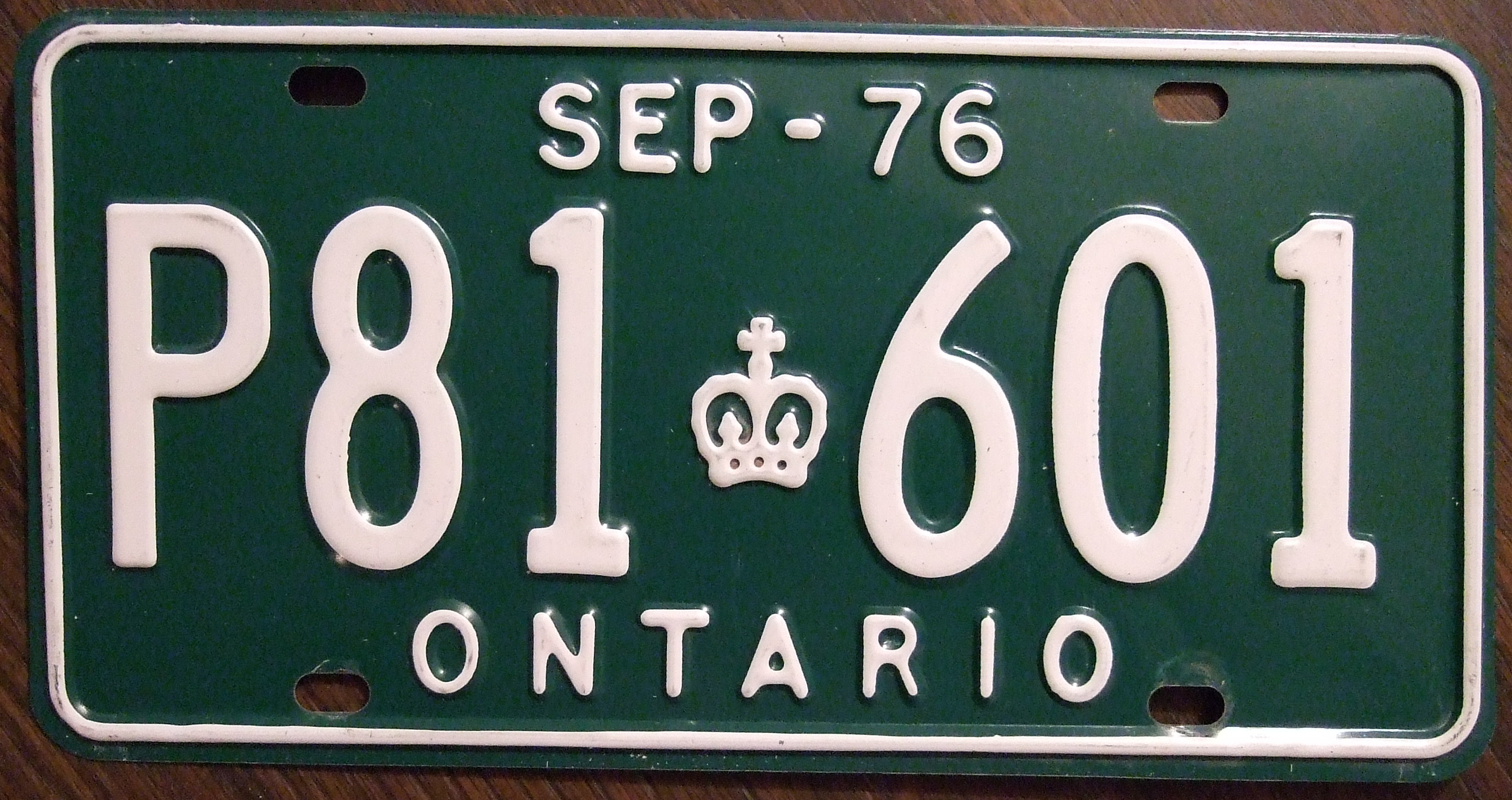

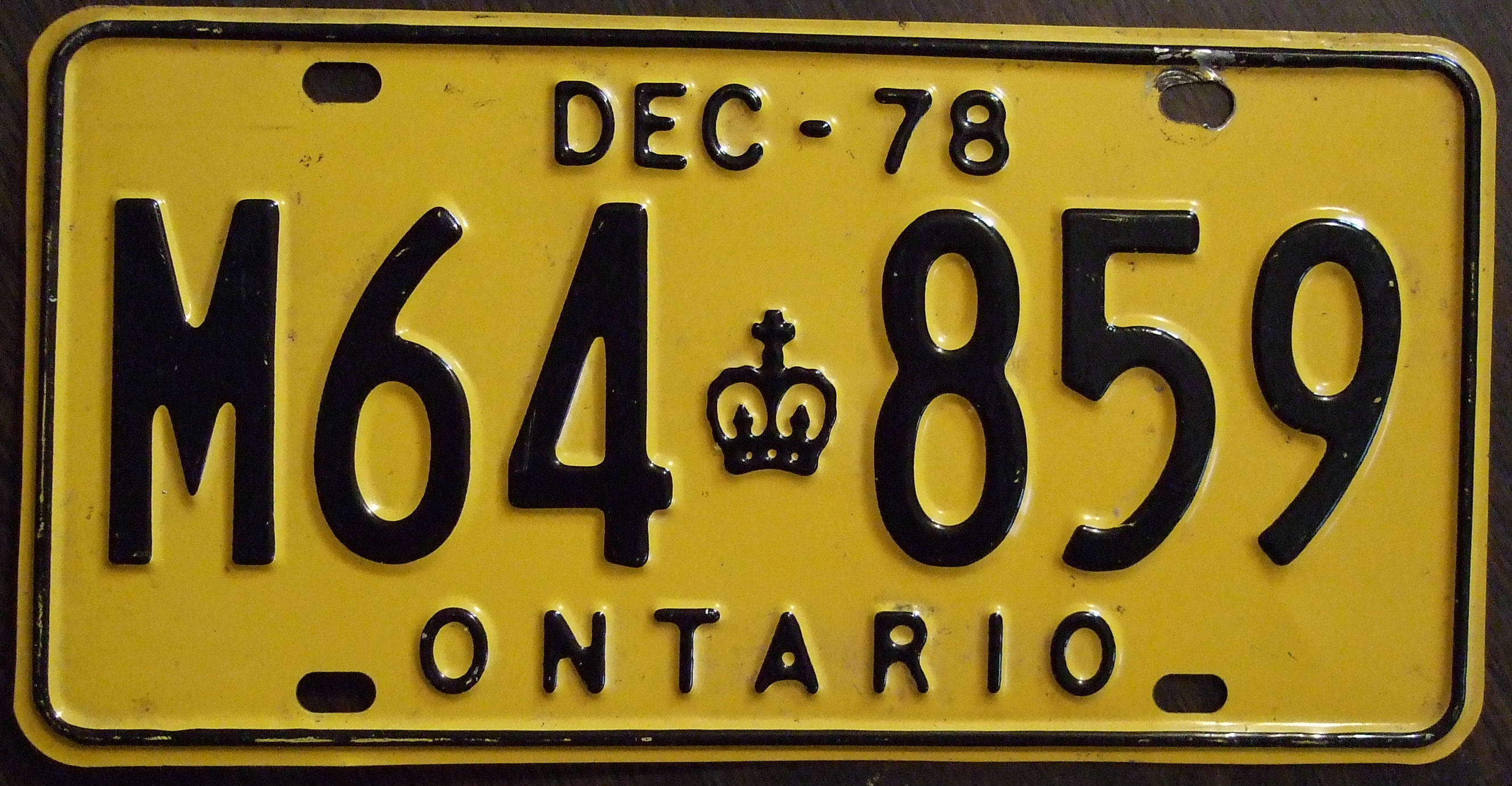

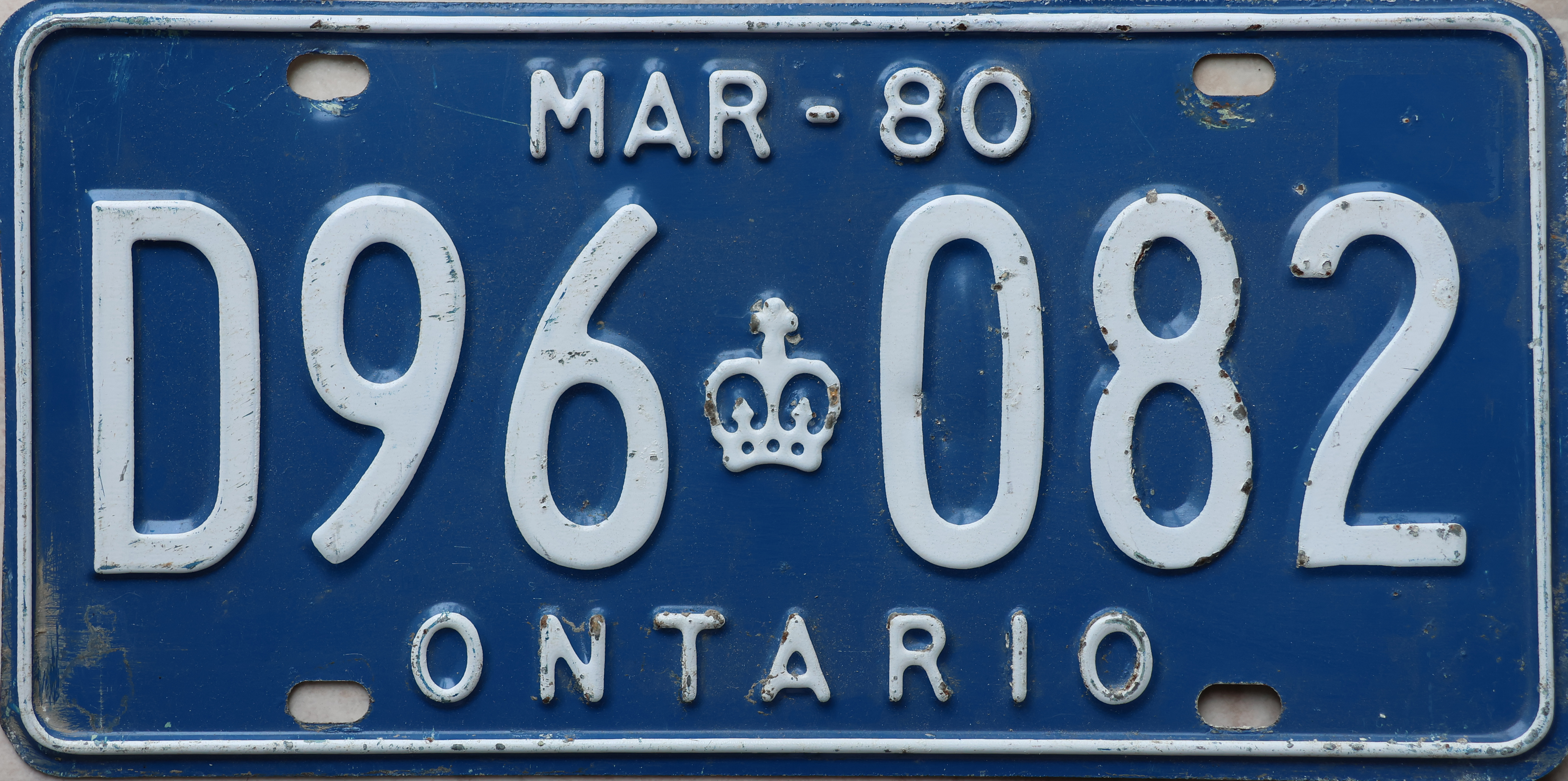
Final quarterly plate issued. Ontario switched to plates renewed with stickers in 1980.

=== 1980 to present ===
In the 1980s, Ontario shifted to plates that were renewed yearly with stickers, ditching the quarterly system.

Image	Dates issued	Description	Slogan	Serial format	Serials issued	Notes
	1980–1995	Black on white with embossed crown separator	none	AB1-234	AA1-001 to ZD9-999	Also used for non-passenger personal vehicles (i.e. pick-up trucks and panel vans).
	1995–1996	Black on reflective white with screened crown separator	"YOURS TO DISCOVER"	AB1-234	ZE1-001 to ZZ9-999	On commercial vehicles, licence plate stickers are affixed in the top right of the front plate, as shown in the photo. The top left corner may be used for other stickers relating to vehicle use or taxation (i.e.: government exemption).
	1996–2011	Black on reflective white with screened crown separator	"YOURS TO DISCOVER"	123-4AB	100-1AA to 999-9ZZ	On commercial vehicles, licence plate stickers are affixed in the top right of the front plate, as shown in the photo. The top left corner may be used for other stickers relating to vehicle use or taxation (i.e.: government exemption).
	2011–present	Black on reflective white with screened crown separator	"YOURS TO DISCOVER"	AB-12345	AA-10001 to CE-72145 (as of December 7, 2025)	On commercial vehicles, licence plate stickers are affixed in the top right of the front plate, as shown in the photo. The top left corner may be used for other stickers relating to vehicle use or taxation (i.e.: government exemption).
	2011–present	Black on reflective white with screened crown separator	"TANT À DÉCOUVRIR"	AB-12345	DA-10001 to DA-19023 (as of January 7, 2024)	On commercial vehicles, licence plate stickers are affixed in the top right of the front plate, as shown in the photo. The top left corner may be used for other stickers relating to vehicle use or taxation (i.e.: government exemption).
	2020	White on reflective, two-hue blue with white stylized trillium separator and white crown placed bottom right	"OPEN FOR BUSINESS"	BF-10000		Never released to public due to visibility issues, scrapped.
	2020	White on reflective, two-hue blue with white stylized trillium separator and white crown placed bottom right	"OUVERT AUX AFFAIRES"	DB-10000		Never released to public due to visibility issues, scrapped.

=== Prorate plates ===
Used on vehicles registered in the International Registration Plan (IRP).

Image	Dates issued	Description	Slogan	Serial format	Serials issued	Notes
	1982–1994	Black on white with embossed crown separator	none	PA1-234	PA1-001 to PJ7-999	
	1994–2006	Black on reflective white with screened crown separator; vertical "PRP" at left	"YOURS TO DISCOVER"	PA1-234	PJ8-001 to PZ9-999	Switched to new reflective plates.
	2006–2019	Black on reflective white with screened crown separator; vertical "PRP" at left	"YOURS TO DISCOVER"	123-4PA	100-1PA to 999-9PZ	
	2019–present	Black on reflective white; vertical "PRP" at left	"YOURS TO DISCOVER"	PA12345	PA10001 to PR26520 (as of June 20, 2025)	

=== Bus plates ===
Bus licence plates were first issued in 1973. They followed the quarterly system until 1980, switching in favour of a new permanent plate renewed yearly with stickers.

Image	Dates issued	Description	Slogan	Serial format	Serials issued	Notes	Usage
	1980–1994	Black reflective on white; "ONTARIO" screened in black at bottom.		BA1-234		The plate's colour is changed to black for this design.	All bus types
	1994–2009	Black reflective on white; "ONTARIO" screened in black on top.	"YOURS TO DISCOVER"	BA1-234	BA1-001 to BN9-999		Plates designated for use on municipal and long distance busses. Letters G, I, O, Q and U not used in this serial format.
	2009–present	Black on reflective white with screened crown separator	"YOURS TO DISCOVER"	123-4BA	101-1BF to 482-1BN (as of November 14, 2025)		Plates designated for use on municipal and long distance busses. Letters G, I, O, Q and U not used in this serial format.
	1980–1994	Black on white with embossed crown separator	none	BP1 234	BP1 001 to BP1 615		Plates designated for use on inter-provincial and long-distance coach busses.
	1994–present	Black on reflective white with screened crown separator	"YOURS TO DISCOVER"	BP1 234	BP2 001 to BP5 349 (as of February 22, 2025)		Plates designated for use on inter-provincial and long-distance coach busses. Letters G, I, O, Q and U not used in this serial format.

=== School bus plates ===
School bus licence plates were first issued in 1975 under a yearly registration. Unlike regular bus licence plates, these plates expired in June at the end of the school year. In 1980, these yearly issued plates were phased out for permanent plates revalidated with stickers annually.

Image	Dates issued	Description	Slogan	Serial format	Serials issued	Notes
	1980–1994	Black on white; "ONTARIO" on bottom	none	SA1-234		Plates no longer issued yearly. Letters A, B, C, D, E, F, H, J, K, L, M, N, P, R, S, T, V, W, X, Y and Z are now used in this serial format. However, letters G, I, O, Q and U are not used in this serial format.
	1994–present	Black relfective on white; "ONTARIO" screened in black on top	"YOURS TO DISCOVER" in black screen in bottom	SA1-234	SA1-001 to SJ9-168 (as of October 18, 2025)	Letters G, I, O, Q and U are not used in this serial format. Switched to reflective plate

=== Farm plates ===
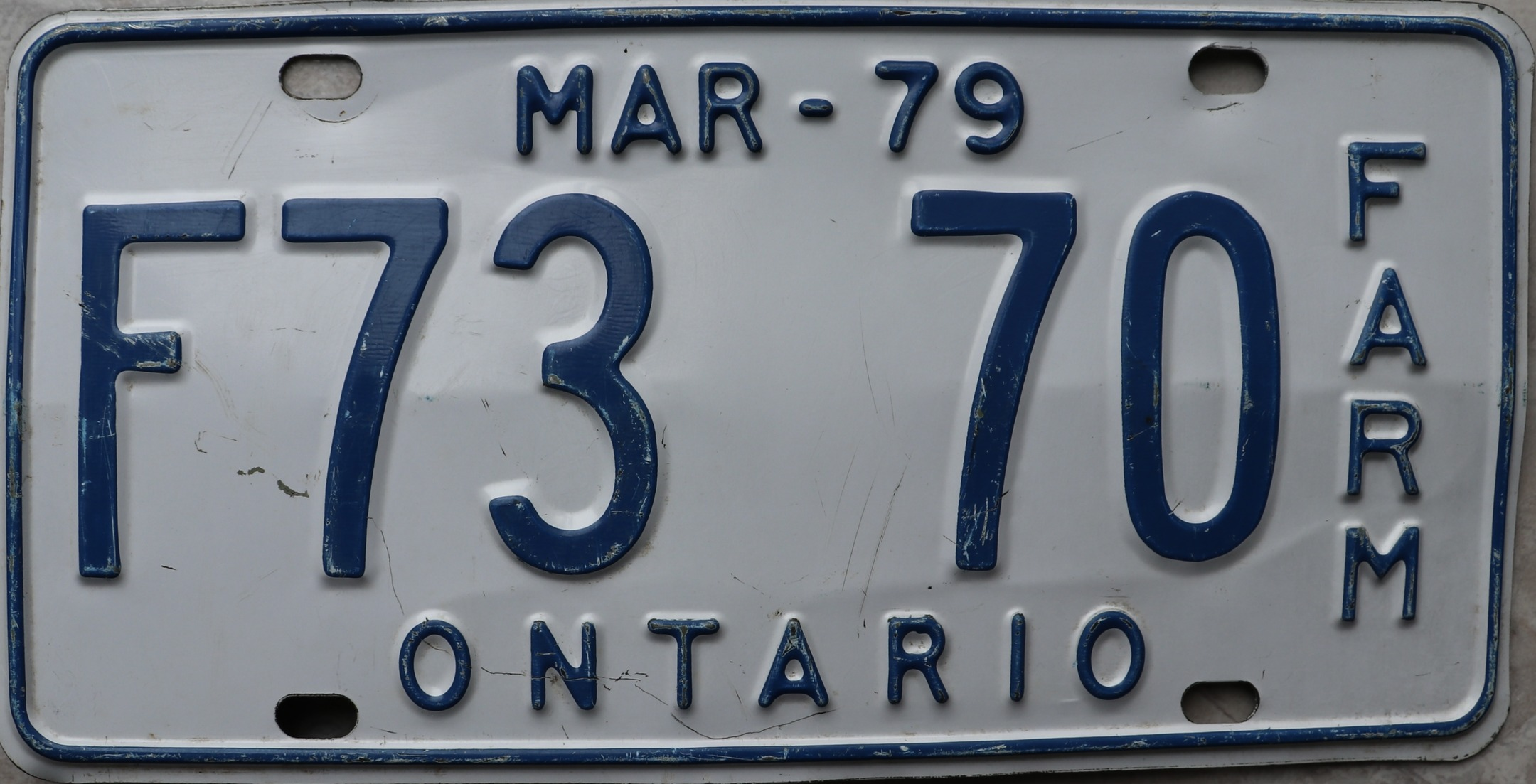
Example of a Farm quarterly plate from 1979.

Farm plates were introduced in 1978 using the quarterly system. In 1980, the plates were switched to permanent plates revalidated with stickers.

Vehicles over 3000 kg owned by farmers and used for farm-related purposes, such as working the soil, building maintenance, and the transportation of farm products, may qualify for a farm plate. Farm-plated trucks and towed trailers may also be used by a farmer for personal transportation.

To qualify, a farmer must meet a series of criteria, including membership in farming organisations and a minimum amount of income that derives from farming. Fees for farm plates are substantially lower than for passenger or commercial plates. The Highway Traffic Act also exempts farm vehicles from several requirements imposed on commercial vehicles.

Farm plates are black on white with a black crown separator, in a pattern similar to commercial plates. They have the word "FARM" written vertically on the left of the plate. Validation stickers are the same as for other vehicles, and are affixed to the front plate, as with commercial plates.

Image	First issued	Description	Slogan	Serial format	Serials issued	Notes
	1980	Black on white; "ONTARIO" on bottom. "FARM" screened vertically on right side.	none	FA1234		Switched to permanent baseplates, renewed annually with validation stickers.
	1982	Black on white; "ONTARIO" on bottom. "FARM" screened vertically on left side.	none	FA1234		"FARM" moved to left side.
	1994	Black reflective on white; "ONTARIO" screened in black on top	"YOURS TO DISCOVER" in black screen in bottom	FA1-234		Introduction of reflective plates.
	2003	Black reflective on white; "ONTARIO" screened in black on top	"YOURS TO DISCOVER" in black screen in bottom	123-4FA	100-1FA to 955-8FY (as of November 8, 2025)	

== Trailer plates ==
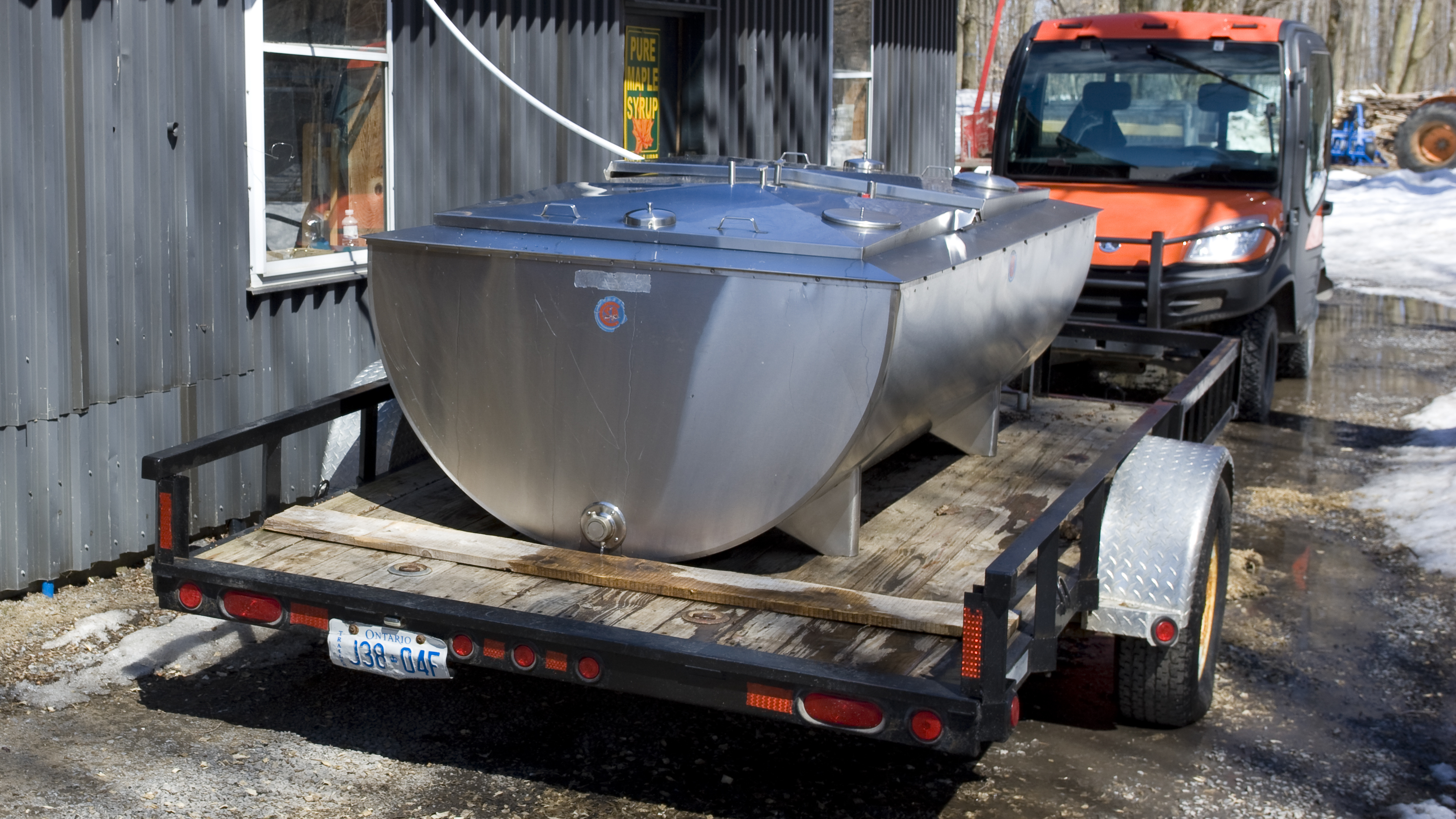
Example of a Trailer plate, affixed to the rear.

All trailers in Ontario are considered separate vehicles and must have a permit and be plated. New owners of a trailer must register with the MTO within six days of purchase. They are then issued with a permit and a plate. Trailer plates are not renewed annually, but may be replaced if lost, damaged or stolen. Plates are affixed to the rear of the trailer. There is no front plate.

All trailers, whether used by commercial operators or others, use a same model plate. Plates are blue on white with crown separator, in a pattern and colour similar to that of passenger vehicles, with the word "TRAILER" written vertically on the left of the plate. However, they do not follow the same numbering system as other vehicles.

=== 1921 to 1973 ===
Trailer plates were first introduced in 1921. Plates issued from 1921 to 1929 had the letter T at the front. In 1930, the letter T was moved to the end of the number. A quarterly system was introduced for trailers starting in 1963.

Image	Dates issued	Description	Slogan	Serial format	Serials issued	Notes
	1934	Embossed black serial; "ONTARIO" at top with year	none	12345·T		Trailer text vertically on left side
	1935	Embossed black serial; "ONTARIO" at top with year	none	12345·T		Trailer text vertically on left side
	1936	Embossed dark yellow serial; "ONTARIO" at bottom with year	none	12345·T		Trailer text vertically on left side
	1937	Embossed white serial; "ONTARIO" at top with year	none	12345·T		Trailer text vertically on left side
	1943	Embossed dark yellow serial; "ONTARIO" at bottom with year	none	12345·T		
	1944	Embossed black serial on yellow plate; "ONTARIO" at top left with crown centred and year at the top right.	none	12345·T		
	1947	Embossed black serial on white plate; "ONTARIO" at top left with crown centred and year at the top right.	none	12345·T		
	1952	Embossed black serial on yellow plate; "ONTARIO" at top left with crown centred and year at the top right.	none	12345·T		
	1953	Embossed white serial on blue plate; "ONTARIO" at top left with crown centred and year at the top right.	none	12345·T		
	1955	Embossed white serial on blue plate; "ONTARIO" at top left with crown centred and year at the top right.	none	12·345T		
	1956	Embossed blue serial on white plate; "ONTARIO" at top left with crown centred and year at the top right.	none	12345·T		
	1959	Embossed white serial on black plate; "ONTARIO" at top left with crown centred and year at the top right.	none	T·12345		
	1962	Embossed black serial on white plate; "ONTARIO" at top left with crown centred and year at the top right.	none	12345·T		

=== 1973 to present ===
By 1973, the quarterly system was phased out in favour of a semi-permanent plate validated each year with an annual sticker. As of 1980, trailer plates no longer require yearly validation stickers, rather a one time fee.

Image	First issued	Description	Slogan	Serial format	Serials issued	Notes
	1973–79	Embossed blue serial with crown separator on white plate with border line; "ONTARIO" centred at top; "73" at bottom left and full sticker box at bottom right	"KEEP IT BEAUTIFUL"	123-45A	10-01Z to 397-61N	Serials issued in reverse
	1979–80	As above, but without "73", and with partial sticker box at bottom right	"KEEP IT BEAUTIFUL"	123-45A	700-97N - 586-49L	Letter M not used.
	1980–84	Embossed blue serial with crown separator on white reflective plate with border line; "ONTARIO" centred at top and "TRAILER" at bottom.	"TRAILER"	123-45A	10-01A - 412-51K	First issue of permanent trailer plates. Reflective plates from Quebec.
	1984–86	Embossed blue serial with crown separator on white reflective plate with border line; "ONTARIO" centred at top and "TRAILER" at bottom.	"TRAILER"	123-45A	604-92K - 999-99M	Introduction of reflective plates from ALCAN. Letter L not used.
	1986	Embossed blue serial with crown separator on white reflective plate with border line; "ONTARIO" centred at top and "TRAILER" at bottom.	"TRAILER"	123-45A	A10-001 - A16-827	
	1986–94	Embossed blue serial with crown separator on white plate with border line; "ONTARIO" centred at top and "TRAILER" at bottom.	"TRAILER"	A12-345	A68-592 - M98-192	Switched back to painted plates due to issues with ALCAN reflective plates.
	1994–2002	Blue on reflective white; "ONTARIO" screened in blue centred at top and vertical trailer text on the left side.	"YOURS TO DISCOVER"	A12-345	N40-861 to Z99-999	Trailer text moved back to the left side vertically.
	2002–2025	Blue on reflective white; "ONTARIO" screened in blue centred at top and vertical trailer text on the left side.	"YOURS TO DISCOVER"	A12-34B	A10-01A to Z99-99Z	
	2025–present	Blue on reflective white; "ONTARIO" screened in blue centred at top and vertical trailer text on the left side.	"YOURS TO DISCOVER"	AB1-23C	AA0-01A to AD2-54K (as of November 21, 2025)	

== Motorcycle vehicle plates ==
Motorcycle plates were first issued in 1911. Issued yearly until 1980 when they switched to yearly renewal with validation stickers.

=== 1911 to 1980 ===
Image	First issued	Description	Slogan	Serial format	Serials issued	Notes
	1965	White on blue; "ONT" screened in white on top with year to the right.	none	123; 1234; 12345		
	1966	Blue on white; "ONT" screened in blue on top with year to the right.	none	A123; 123A		
	1968	Blue on white; "ONT" screened in blue on top with year to the right.	none	12345		
	1972	Blue on white; "ONT" screened in blue on top with year to the right.	none	12345		
	1973	White on blue; "ONT" screened in blue on top with year to the right.	none	12345		
	1974	Blue on white; "ONT" screened in blue on top with year to the right.	none	12345		
	1975	White on blue; "ONT" screened in blue on top with year to the right.	none	12345		
	1976	Blue on white; "ONT" screened in blue on top with year to the right.	none	12345		
	1977	White on blue; "ONT" screened in blue on top with year to the right.	none	12345		
	1978	Blue on white; "ONT" screened in blue on top with year to the right.	none	12345		
	1979	White on blue; "ONT" screened in blue on top with year to the right.	none	12345		
	1980	Blue on white; "ONT" screened in blue on top with year to the right.	none	12345		Plates issued in 1980 were re-used in 1981 with a validation sticker.

=== 1980 to present ===
Image	First issued	Description	Slogan	Serial format	Serials issued	Notes
	1980	Blue on white; "ONT" screened in blue on top.	none	12345; A1234	10001 to 99999; Z1001 to Z9999	Validation stickers were used on 1980 plates for 1981, year was removed by 1982.
	1981–82	Blue on white; "ONT" screened in blue on top	none	A1234	Y0001 to S9999	Serials issued in reverse
	1982–91	Blue on white; "ONT" screened in blue on top	none	A1234; 123AB	R0001 to H9999; 001AA to 999EZ; 001NA to 999ZZ	
	1991–94	Blue on white; "ONT" screened in blue on top	none	AB123	FA001 TO KZ999	
	1994–96	Blue on reflective white; "ONT" screened in blue on top	none	AB123	LA001 to LZ999	Switched to new reflective plate design
	1996–2003	Blue on reflective white; "ONT" screened in blue on top	none	1A234	1A001 - 9Z999	
	2003–08	Blue on reflective white; "ONT" screened in blue on top	none	123A4	100A1 to 999Z9	
	2008–13	Blue on reflective white; "ONT" screened in blue on top	none	1234A	0001A to 9999Z	
	2013–2024	Blue on reflective white; "ONT" screened in blue on top	none	1A2B3	0A0A1 to 0X1J6 (as of July 6, 2023)	Used occasionally; "ONT" stands for Ontario.
	2024	Blue on reflective white; "ONT" screened in blue on top	none	12A3B	00A0A to 50E5C (as of September 6, 2025)	Used occasionally; "ONT" stands for Ontario.

=== Off-road vehicle plates ===
These licence plates are issued to ATVs and other vehicles for off roading uses.

Image	First issued	Description	Slogan	Serial format	Serials issued	Notes
	1984	Green on reflective white; "ONT" screened in green on top	none	123AB	001AA to 999ZZ	Used occasionally; "ONT" stands for Ontario.
		Green on reflective white; "ONT" screened in green on top	none	AB123	AA001 to P????	Used occasionally; "ONT" stands for Ontario.
	1994	Green on reflective white; "ONT" screened in green on top	none	AB123	P???? to ZZ999	Used occasionally; "ONT" stands for Ontario.
	2002	Green on reflective white; "ONT" screened in green on top	none	12AB3	11AA1 to 99ZZ9	Used occasionally; "ONT" stands for Ontario.
	2013	Green on reflective white; "ONT" screened in green on top	none	1AB23	1AA11 to 4J26H (as of July 18, 2025)	Used occasionally; "ONT" stands for Ontario.

=== Moped plates ===
Image	First issued	Description	Slogan	Serial format	Serials issued	Notes
	1976	White on reflective red; "ONT 1976" screened in white on top	none	A1234		
	1977	Red on reflective white; "ONT 1977" screened in red on top	none	A1234		
	1978	White on reflective red; "ONT 1978" screened in white on top	none	A1234		
	1979	Red on reflective white; "ONT 1979" screened in red on top and "MOPED" at bottom	none	A1234		
	1980	Red on reflective white; "ONT 1980" screened in red on top and "MOPED" at bottom	none	A1234		
	1981	Red on reflective white; "ONT" screened in red on top and "MOPED" at bottom	none	A1234		Year removed, sticker box added.
	1982	Red on reflective white; "ONT" screened in red on top and "MOPED" at bottom	none	A1234		Sticker box removed.
	1994	Red on reflective white; "ONT" screened in red on top and "MOPED" at bottom	none	A1234		New reflective plate. Used occasionally; "ONT" stands for Ontario.
	2004	Red on reflective white; "ONT" screened in red on top and "MOPED" at bottom	none	AB123	EA001 to EE544 (as of July 27, 2025)	New serial format. Used occasionally; "ONT" stands for Ontario.

=== Snowmobile plates ===
Unlike all Ontario licence plates — which were changed to reflective plates in 1994 — the snowmobile plates remain non-reflective.

Image	Dates issued	Description	Slogan	Serial format	Serials issued	Notes
	1970	Green on white; "ONT" screened on top	none	AB123		
	1972	As above, but yellow on blue	none	AB123		
	1973	Green on white; "ONT" screened on top	none	AB123		
	1974	As 1970, 1973 and 1975, but inverted to white on green	none	AB123		
	1975	Green on white; "ONT" screened on top	none	AB123		
	1999	Blue on white; "ONTARIO" in the Helvetica Bold font screened on top	none	123456		
	2009	Blue on white; "ONTARIO" in the Helvetica Bold font screened on top	none	0AA000		Serial format switched back to two-letter format after 999999 series (2009).

== Dual purpose plates ==
Dual purpose license plates were first introduced in 1927. They were issued to vehicles that could be used for both personal and commercial purposes. Vehicles such as RV's, station wagons & motor-homes. They were noted by the X prefix. However, these plates were discontinued in 1973 and are no longer issued.

=== 1927 to 1972 ===
Image	First issued	Design	Slogan	Serial format	Serials issued	Notes
	1927	Black serial on yellow plate; "ONTARIO." and "1927" at bottom	none	X1-234		
	1928	Black serial on yellow plate; "ONTARIO." and "1928" at bottom	none	X1-234		
	1929	Black serial on white plate; "ONTARIO." and "1929" at bottom	none	X12-345		
	1930	Black serial on white plate; "ONTARIO." and "1930" at bottom	none	1234-X		
	1931	Black serial on yellow plate; "ONTARIO." and "1931" at top	none	1234-X		
	1932	Black serial on white plate; "ONTARIO." and "1932" at top	none	1-234-X		
	1933	Black serial on yellow plate; "ONTARIO." and "1933" at top	none	1234-X		
	1934	Black serial on white plate; "ONTARIO." and "1934" at top	none	X-1234; 1234-X		
	1935	Black serial on orange plate; "19 ONTARIO 35" at top	none	1234-X		
	1936	White serial on black plate; "19 ONTARIO 36" at bottom	none	1234-X		
	1937	White serial on red plate; "ONTARIO." and "1937" at top	none	1234-X		
	1938	Red serial on blue plate; "ONTARIO." at bottom and "1938" at top	none	123X		
	1939	White serial on black plate; "ONTARIO." at bottom and "1939" at top	none	1234X		
	1940	Black serial on yellow plate; "ONTARIO." and "1940" at top	none	1234X		
	1941	Green serial on white plate; "ONTARIO." and "1941" at top	none	1234X		
	1942	Black serial on yellow plate; "ONTARIO." and "1942" at top	none	1234X		
	1945	White serial on blue plate; "ONTARIO." and "1945" at top	none	1234X		
	1946	White serial on black plate; "ONTARIO." and "1946" at top	none	1234X		
	1947	Black serial on yellow plate; "ONTARIO." and "1947" at top	none	1234X		
	1948	White serial on blue plate; "ONTARIO." and "1948" at top	none	123X		
	1951	Blue serial on white plate; "19-ONTARIO-51." at top	none	1234X		
	1953	White serial on blue plate; "ONTARIO." and "1953" at top	none	12X		
	1954	Blue serial on white plate; "ONTARIO." and "1954" at top	none	X1234; 1234X		
	1955	White serial on blue plate; "ONTARIO." and "1955" at top	none	X123-4; 1-234X		
	1956	Blue serial on white plate; "ONTARIO." and "1956" at top	none	X-12345; 12345-X		
	1957	White serial on black plate; "ONTARIO." and "1957" at top	none	X-12345; 12345-X		
	1958	Black serial on white plate; "ONTARIO." and "1958" at top	none	X-12345; 12345-X		
	1959	White serial on black plate; "ONTARIO." and "1959" at top	none	X-12345; 12345-X		
	1960	Black serial on white plate; "ONTARIO." and "1960" at top	none	X-12345; 12345-X		
	1961	White serial on black plate; "ONTARIO." and "1961" at top	none	X-12345; 12345-X		
	1962	Black serial on white plate; "ONTARIO." and "1962" at top	none	X-12345; 12345-X		
	1963	White serial on black plate; "ONTARIO." and "1963" at top	none	X-12345 12345-X		
	1964	Black serial on white plate; "ONTARIO." and "1964" at top	none	X-12345; 12345-X		
	1965	White serial on blue plate; "ONTARIO." and "1965" at top	none	X-12345; 12345-X		
	1966	Blue serial on white plate; "ONTARIO." and "1966" at top	none	X-12345; 12345-X		
	1967	White serial on blue plate; "19 ONTARIO 67." at top and "18 CONFEDERATION 67" at bottom	none	X12-345; 123-45X		
	1968	Blue serial on white plate; "ONTARIO." at bottom and "1968" at top	none	X12-345; 123-45X		
	1969	White serial on blue plate; "ONTARIO." at bottom and "1969" at top	none	X12-345; 123-45X		
	1970	Blue serial on white plate; "ONTARIO." at bottom and "1970" at top	none	X12-345; 123-45X		
	1971	White serial on blue plate; "ONTARIO." at bottom and "1971" at top	none	X12-345; 123-45X		
	1972	Blue serial on white plate; "ONTARIO." at bottom and "1972" at top	none	X1-234; 12-34X		

== Diplomatic plates ==
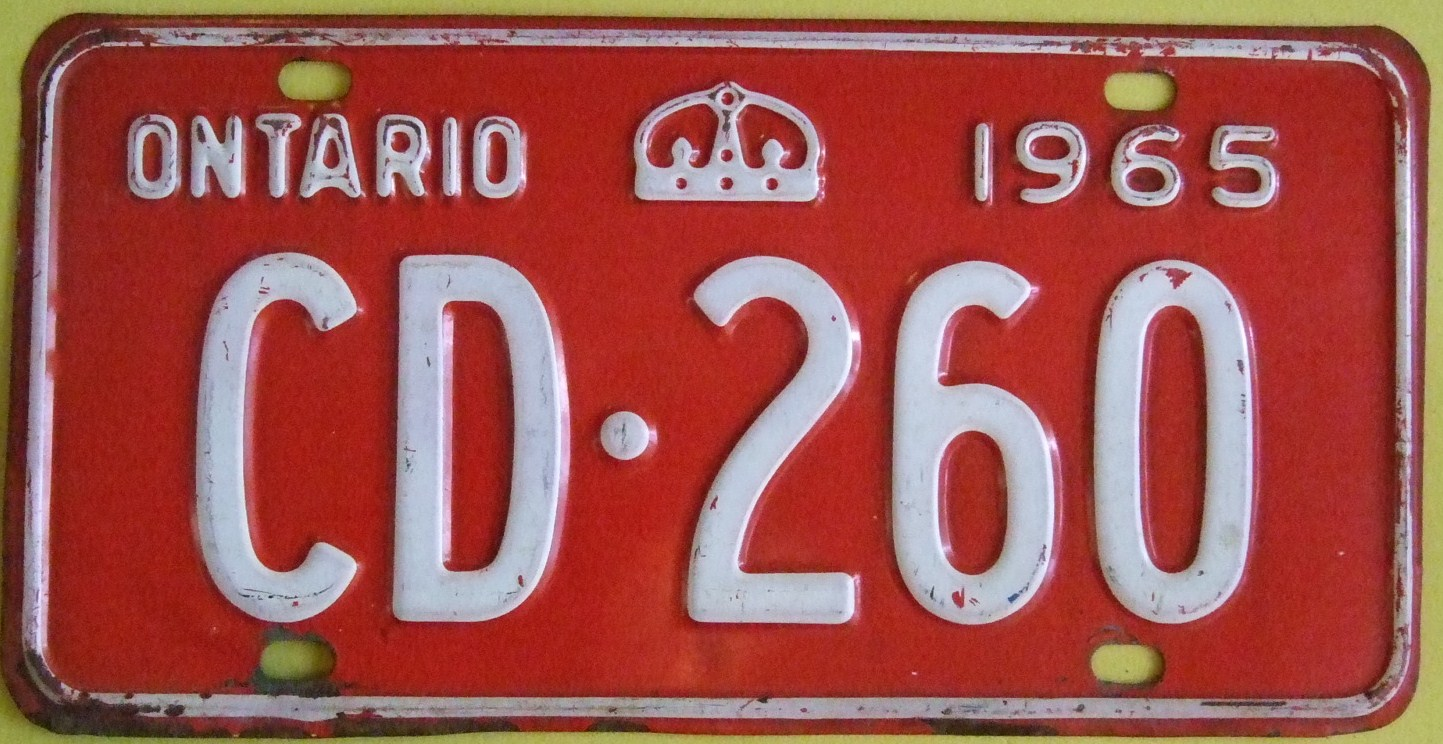
Example of an older style Diplomatic plate from 1965.

In Ontario, diplomatic plates were first issued in the 1950s. The first red licence plate was issued in 1959. Yearly plates were issued until 1986, when permanent plates renewed with stickers were introduced the following year. The ABC-123 serial format began in 1973.

The current design is a white serial on red plate, using the 123-ABC serial format. "YOURS TO DISCOVER" is screened at the bottom. The red plate colour is exclusive to diplomatic plates.

Any foreign representatives and their accredited family members are required to obtain special red diplomatic licence plates when registering passenger vehicles within 30 days of taking up residence in the province. This rule does not apply to the registration of motorcycles.

These plates are most commonly found in Ottawa and Toronto where embassies and foreign government operations are located.

Image	First issued	Description	Slogan	Type	Serial format	Serials issued	Notes
	1994	White on reflective red with crown separator.	"YOURS TO DISCOVER"	Diplomatic	123-CDA	101-CDA to 065-CDX (as of December 4, 2025)	Ontario plates do not bear indications of the mission. Low numbers assigned to heads of missions (i.e.: ambassadors).
	1994	White on reflective red with crown separator.	"YOURS TO DISCOVER"	Consulate	123-CCA	101-CCA to 609-CCD (as of July 18, 2025)	
	1994	White on reflective red with crown separator.	"YOURS TO DISCOVER"	Embassy Staff	123-XTR	101-XTR to 969-XTW (as of September 28, 2025)	Reserved for non-diplomat embassy staff.
	1994	White on reflective red with crown separator.	"YOURS TO DISCOVER"	External Organization	123-XOR	101-XOR to 205-XOR (as of June 25, 2023)	Issued to envoys without diplomatic recognition.

== Dealer and service licence plates ==
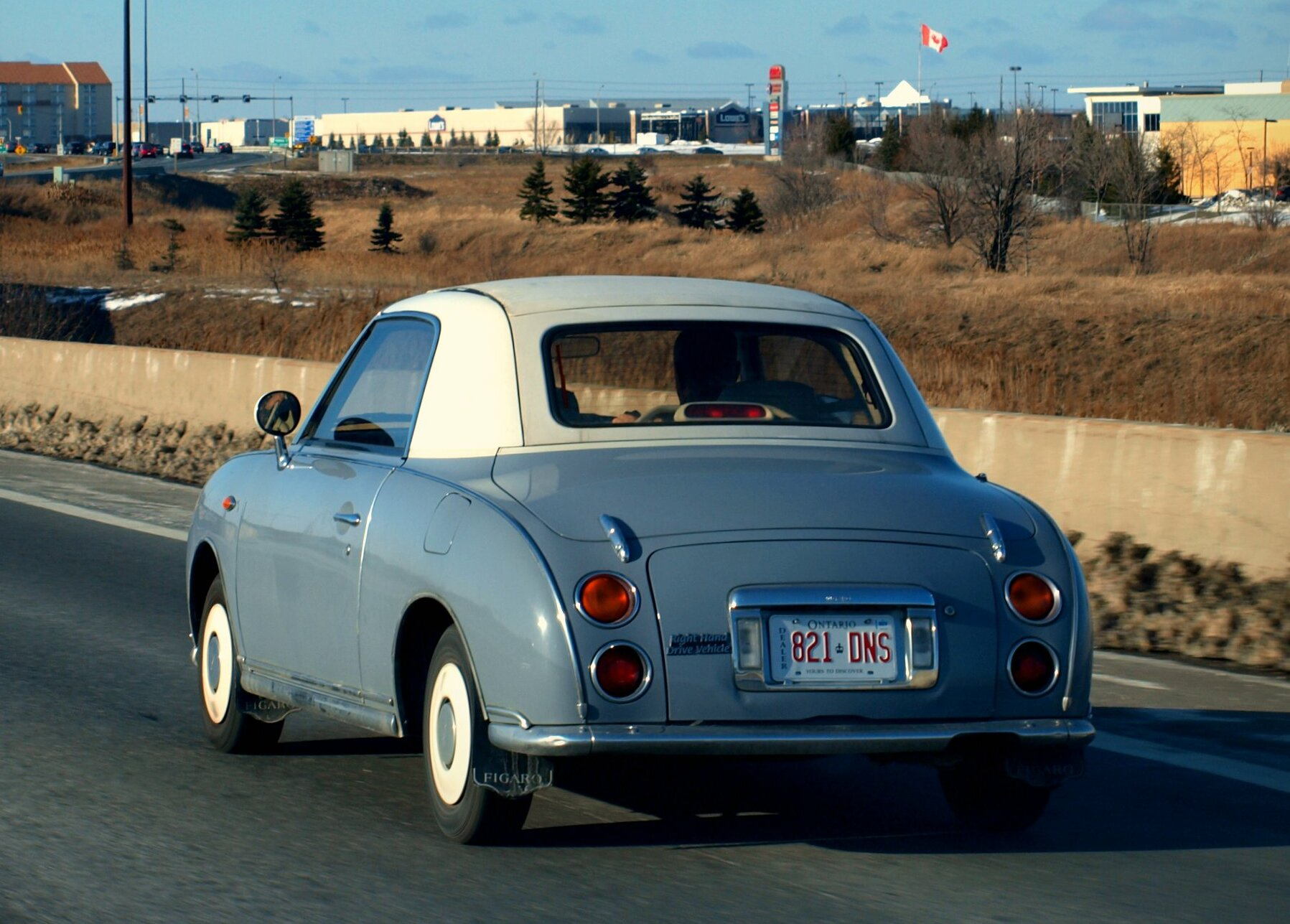
A Dealer plate is affixed only to the rear of a vehicle.

In Ontario, motor vehicle dealers licensed under the Motor Vehicle Dealers Act use a single portable plate with the word "DEALER" on the left side and red alpha-numeric characters on a white background. It is for exclusive use by motor vehicle dealers only on motor vehicles owned as part of the dealer's inventory of vehicles for sale. It may also be used for private use vehicles that are owned as part of the dealer's inventory of vehicles for sale.

Service providers, including anyone who repairs, customizes, modifies, manufactures or transports motor vehicles or trailers use yellow and black DLR series plates (Dealer and Service Plate).

A service plate may be used:

- on a trailer or motor vehicle other than a motorcycle or motor-assisted bicycle for purposes related to the repair, road testing, customization or modification of the vehicle, if the vehicle is in the possession of the person to whom the service plate is issued, or
- for the purpose of transporting the vehicle by a person engaged in the business of transporting vehicles, or
- for purposes related to the manufacturing or sale of a trailer, or
- for the purpose of towing the vehicle by a person engaged in the business of transporting vehicles, or
- to tow a vehicle to a location where its load will be removed or to an impound facility.

Private use of motor vehicles or trailers with a service plate is not permitted.

Image	First issued	Description	Slogan	Serial format	Serials issued	Notes
	1994	Black on yellow background, with crown separator.	"YOURS TO DISCOVER"	123-DAB	001-DAA to 836-DXL (as of December 8, 2025)	Removable service plate. Before 2007 also used by vehicle dealers. See below.
	2007	Red stamped identification on a white reflective background. Screened in black: "DEALER" written vertically on the left, crown separator, "ONTARIO" across the top and "Yours to discover".	"YOURS TO DISCOVER"	123-DAB	011-DLA to 909-DTH (as of November 15, 2025)	Removable plate restricted to car dealers. Introduced in 2007 to differentiate dealer's inventory from vehicles being serviced. See below. Issued singly, to be displayed at the rear of the vehicle.

=== Motorcycle dealer plates ===
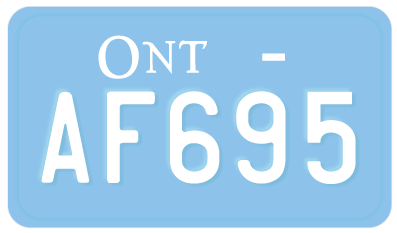
An example of a current motorcycle dealer plate.

Dealer plates for motorcycles have been issued since the 1920s. Very few of these early plates were issued, thus making it a rare plate. The 'M' prefix was featured on all plates before 1973. From 1973 to 1979 they were issued with the 'DL' prefix, with a similar design to regular motorcycle plates. In 1982, the government began issuing permanent plates with yearly registration stickers. Reflective plates were introduced in 1994.

The current plate design is a white serial on a light blue plate. These plates are the same size as regular motorcycle plates. The serial format used by these plates is AB123, running from AA001 to AH486 (as of March 2, 2025)

== Other non-passenger plates ==
Image	First issued	Description	Slogan	Serial format	Serials issued	Notes
	2004	Printed on security paper with barcode	10 Day Temporary Permit/Permis Provisoire de Dix Jours	A-123456		Temporary use only, placed on dashboard at windshield.
	2017	Blue on reflective white; "ONTARIO" screened in blue centred at top with MFR vertically on left side.	"YOURS TO DISCOVER"	123-MPA	101-MPA to 457-MPB (as of October 22, 2022)	Manufacturer License plate. New plate as of 2017.

=== Medical doctor plates ===
Medical doctor plates were first introduced in 1930, and are denoted by the letters starting with MD. When all the MDA - MDZ serials had been issued in the late 1990s, new serials using MAA started being issued.

Image	Dates issued	Description	Slogan	Serial format	Serials issued	Notes
	1973	Blue on white; "73" on bottom left and sticker box on bottom right	"KEEP IT BEAUTIFUL"	MDA-123		
	1978	As above, but with no "73"	"KEEP IT BEAUTIFUL"	MD-123		
	1982	As above, but with no sticker box	"YOURS TO DISCOVER"	MDA-123		
	1994	Blue reflective on white; "ONTARIO" screened in blue on top	"YOURS TO DISCOVER"	123-MAA	001-MAA to 205-MAE (as of September 7, 2025)	

=== Amateur radio plates ===
Amateur Radio plates were introduced in 1969 as supplemental plates. In 1976, Ontario permitted the call-sign to be on regular passenger plates, eliminating the small supplemental plates.

Image	First issued	Description	Slogan	Serial format	Serials issued	Notes
	1969	Yellow on black; "RADIO" on top and "AMATEUR" on bottom	none	VE3ABC		
	1976	Blue on white; "ONTARIO" screened in blue on top	"KEEP IT BEAUTIFUL"	VE3-ABC		
	1983	As above, but with no "73"	"YOURS TO DISCOVER"	VE3ABC		The format switched back to its original format. Returned in 1986.
	1994	Blue reflective on white; "ONTARIO" screened in blue on top	"YOURS TO DISCOVER"	VE3ABC		Switched to new reflective plate
	1994	Blue reflective on white; "ONTARIO" screen in blue on top	"YOURS TO DISCOVER"	VA3AB		For 5-digit amateur radio callsigns

=== Special event plates ===
Image	Date issued	Description	Slogan	Serial format	Notes
	1984		"YOURS TO DISCOVER"		Used in the motorcade of Queen Elizabeth II at provincial events during her Royal Visit of 1984
	1984		"YOURS TO DISCOVER"		Used during the visit of Pope John Paul II to Ontario during the Papal Visit of 1984
	1989		"YOURS TO DISCOVER"		Commemorative plates to celebrate the 50th Anniversary of the QEW highway. Plates used by police.
	1991		"YOURS TO DISCOVER"		Given to MTO employees in celebration of the agency's 75th anniversary.
	2000		"YOURS TO DISCOVER"		Plates for the CCMTA Conference 2000
	2002		"YOURS TO DISCOVER"		Used in the Queen's motorcade during the 2002 Royal Jubilee Visit to Ontario.
	2010		'none'		G20 Summit Special plates used in Toronto
	2016		"YOURS TO DISCOVER"		Given to MTO employees in celebration of the agency's 100th anniversary.

== Vanity licence plates ==
Along with regular series plates, the province also offers vanity plates for passenger and commercial vehicles. A personalized licence plate message may contain almost any combination of letters and numbers from two to eight characters. The plates can also include one of 60 different graphics, with two to six characters. Available graphics have changed over the years, with some becoming available, while others have been withdrawn or modified. Owners selecting a graphic but no custom message are generally assigned a registration with a 12XY34 pattern, where the XY is a code indicating the design (i.e.: LN and LM = Loon, CF = Canadian Flag, etc.).

The province reserves the right to refuse or withdraw plates for a variety of reasons, including:

- Sexual messages
- Abusive, obscene language and derogatory slang
- Promotion or denunciation of religion and religious figures
- Promotion of use of drugs or alcohol
- Messages relating to politics, political figures, negative statements on institutions and persons, public personalities, or police badge numbers
- Advocating or promoting violence or crime
- Any discriminatory statement
- Ambiguous or confusing numbers, or which may be mistaken for another existing plate (about 1 in 3 rejections)
- Messages which may infringe on copyright and intellectual property

While criteria have existed since the introduction of personalized plates, accusations of excessive zeal led the McGuinty government to set up a review committee in August 2008. The eight-member committee meets weekly to review submissions. In the first half of 2013, it had rejected 3% of requests. Plates have also been withdrawn after issue.

The COVID-19 pandemic of 2020 brought renewed attention to the work of the Personalized License Plate Review Committee as it rejected personalized plates based on this theme.

The ownership of plates with graphic elements associated with particular groups, such as veterans or firefighters, may be restricted and require proof of eligibility.

Personalized plates with two to five characters are also available for motorcycles.

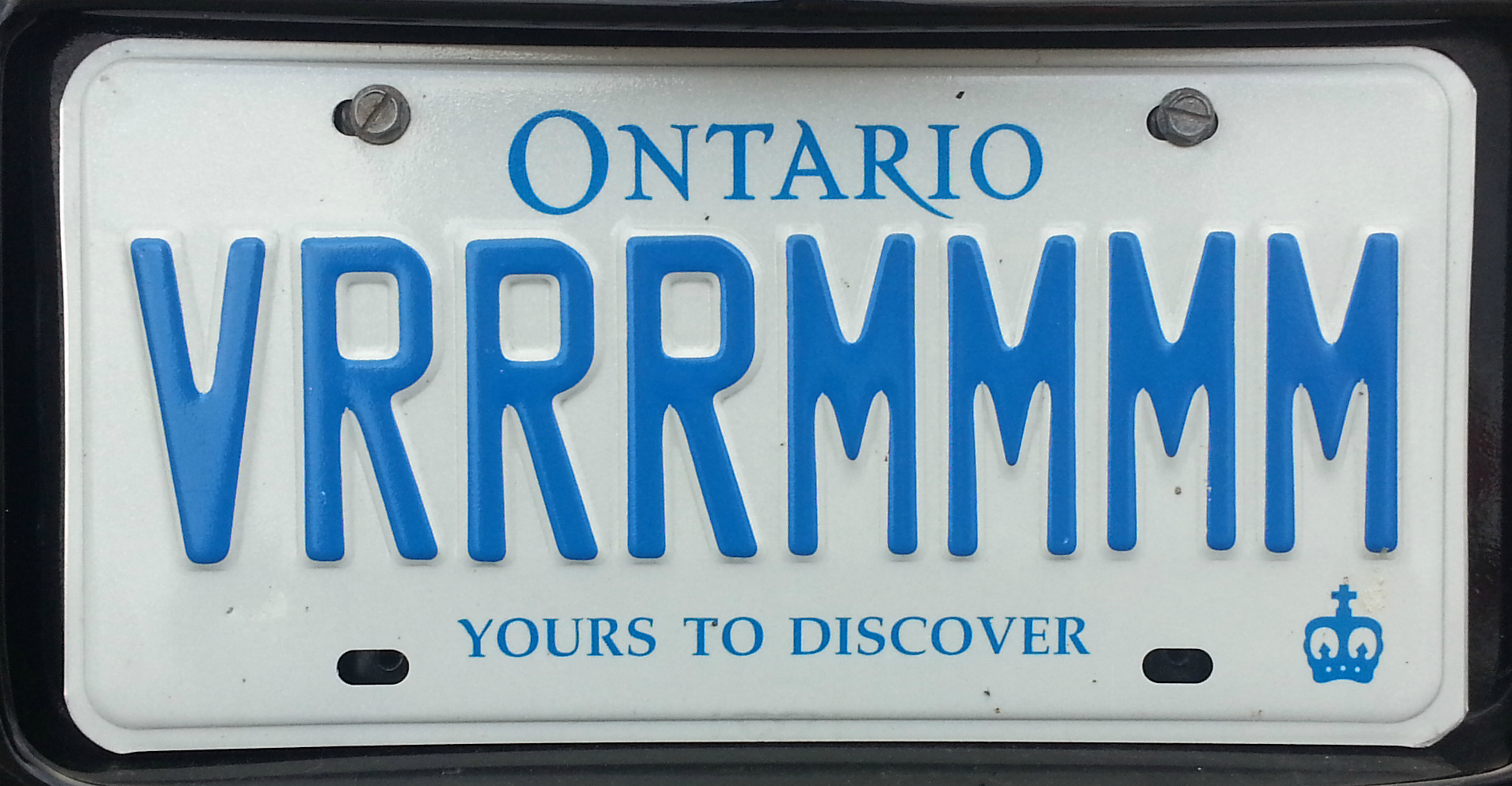
Ontario personalised plates can have up to eight characters, including letters, numbers and the crown.

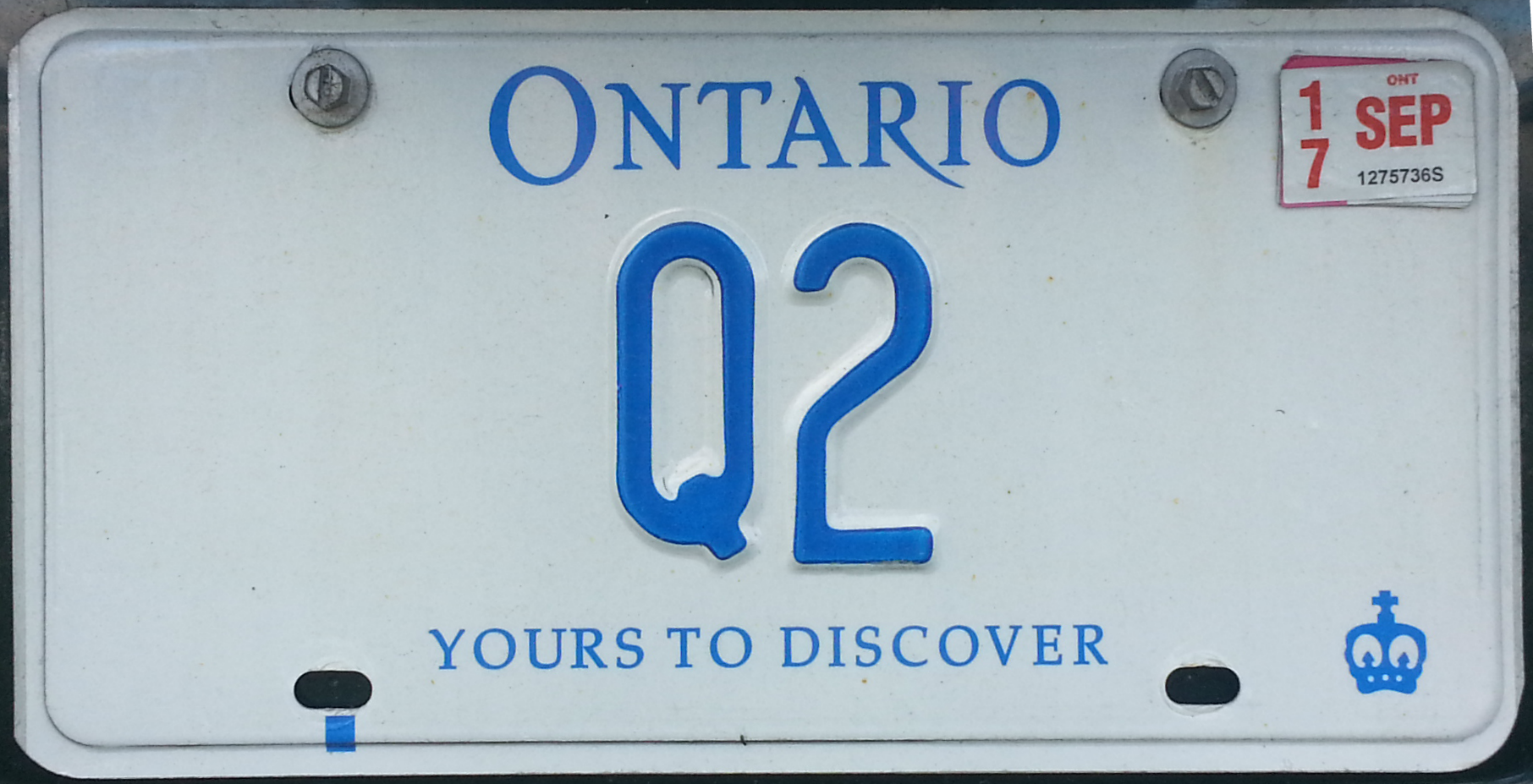
The minimum number of characters is two.

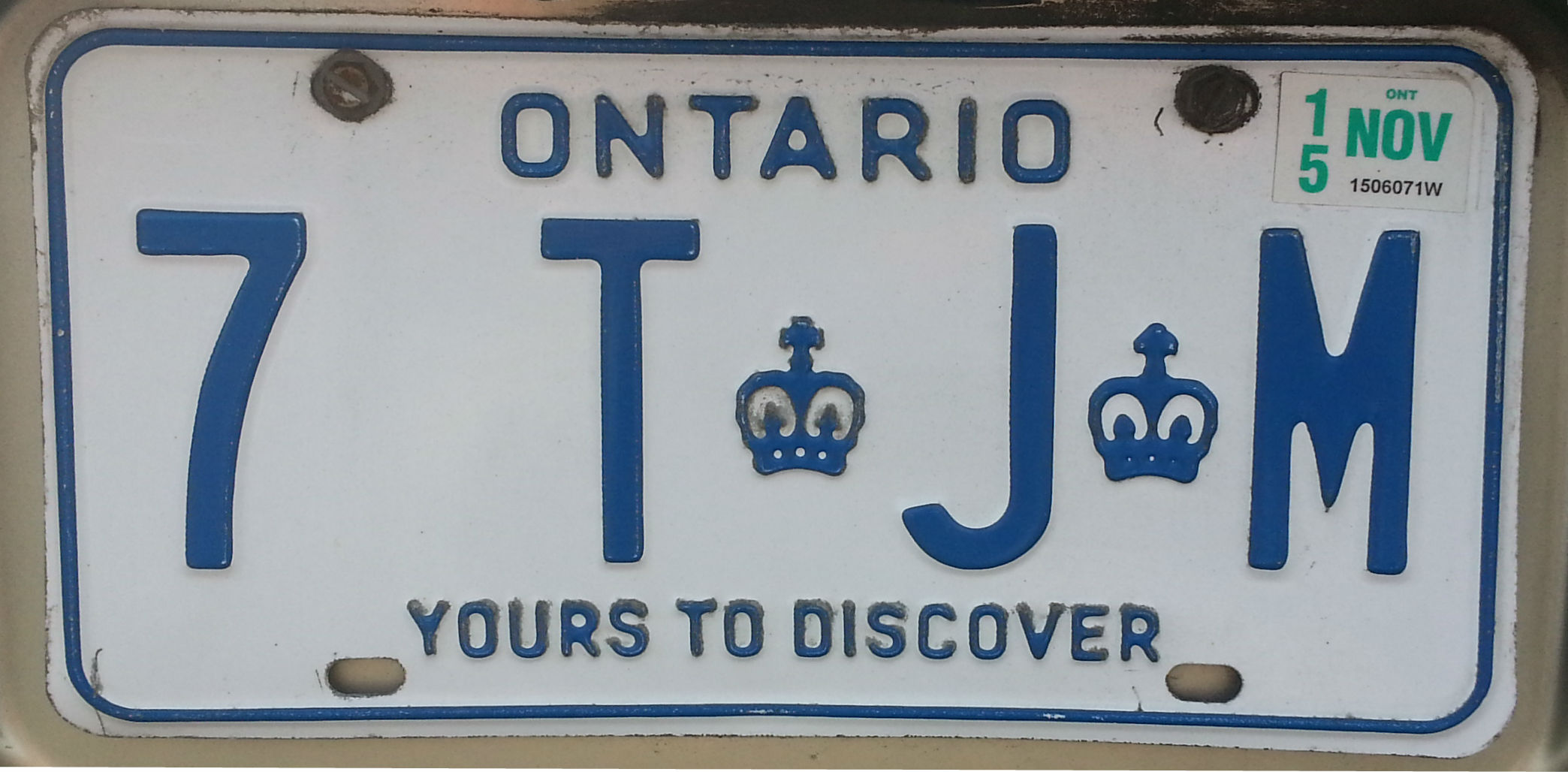
Personalized licence plate. Note the use of the crown as a character.

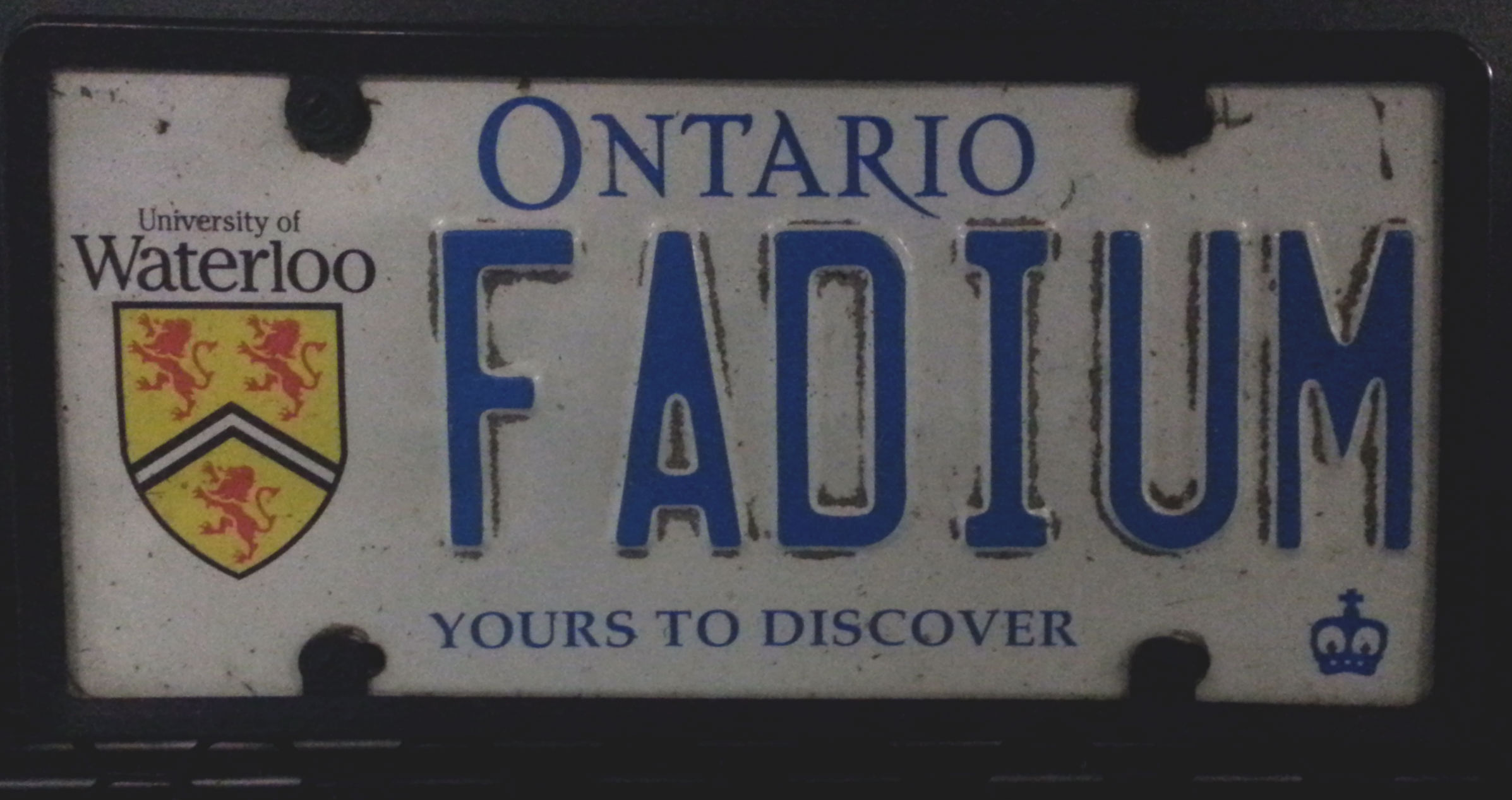
Plate with both a graphic element and a personalised registration. This example bears the logo of the University of Waterloo. The dark areas around the digits are dirt, and not part of the design.

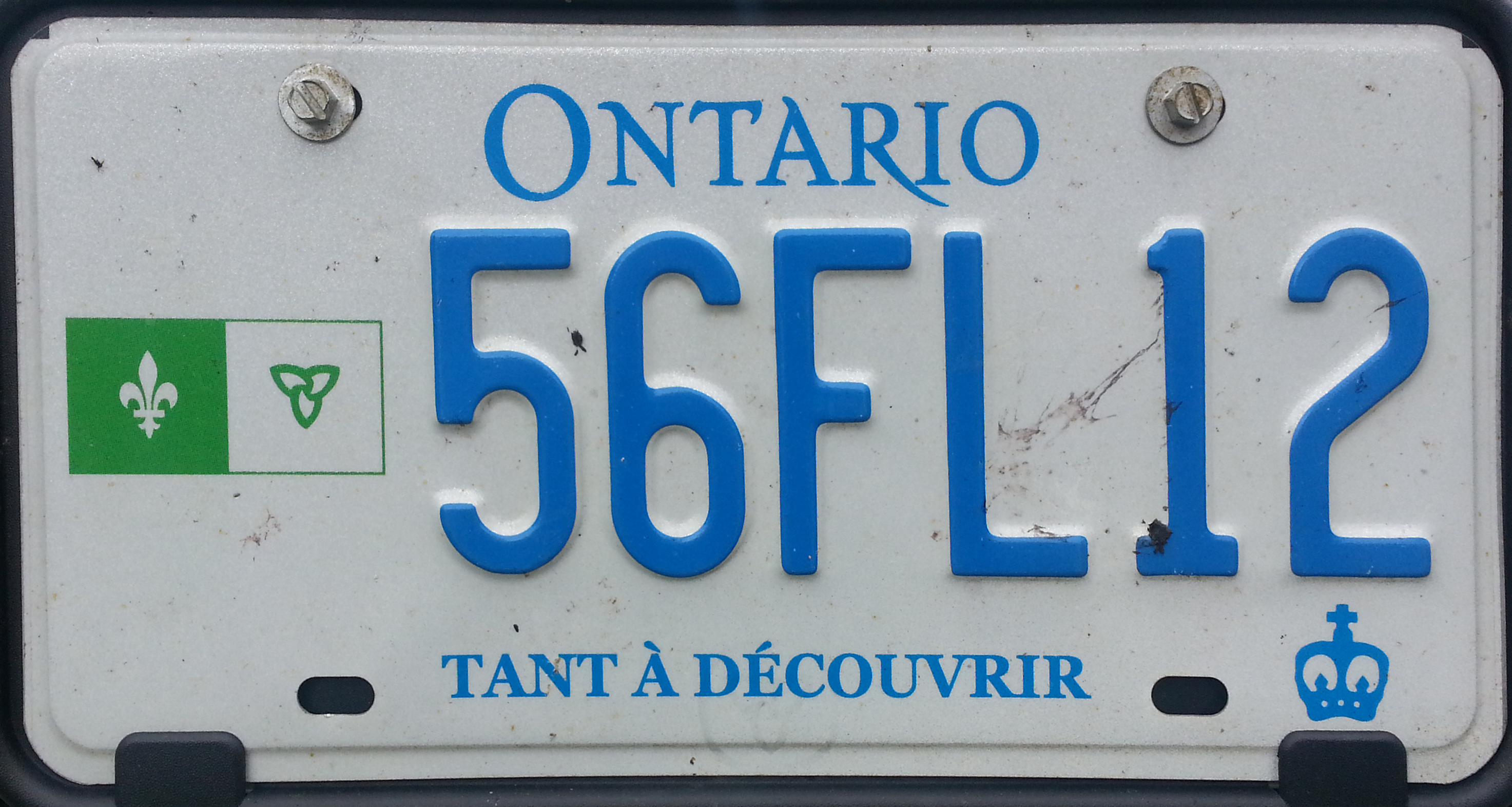
Personalized plate bearing the image of the Franco-Ontarian flag ("FL" code). The marketing legend reads "Tant à découvrir", in French.

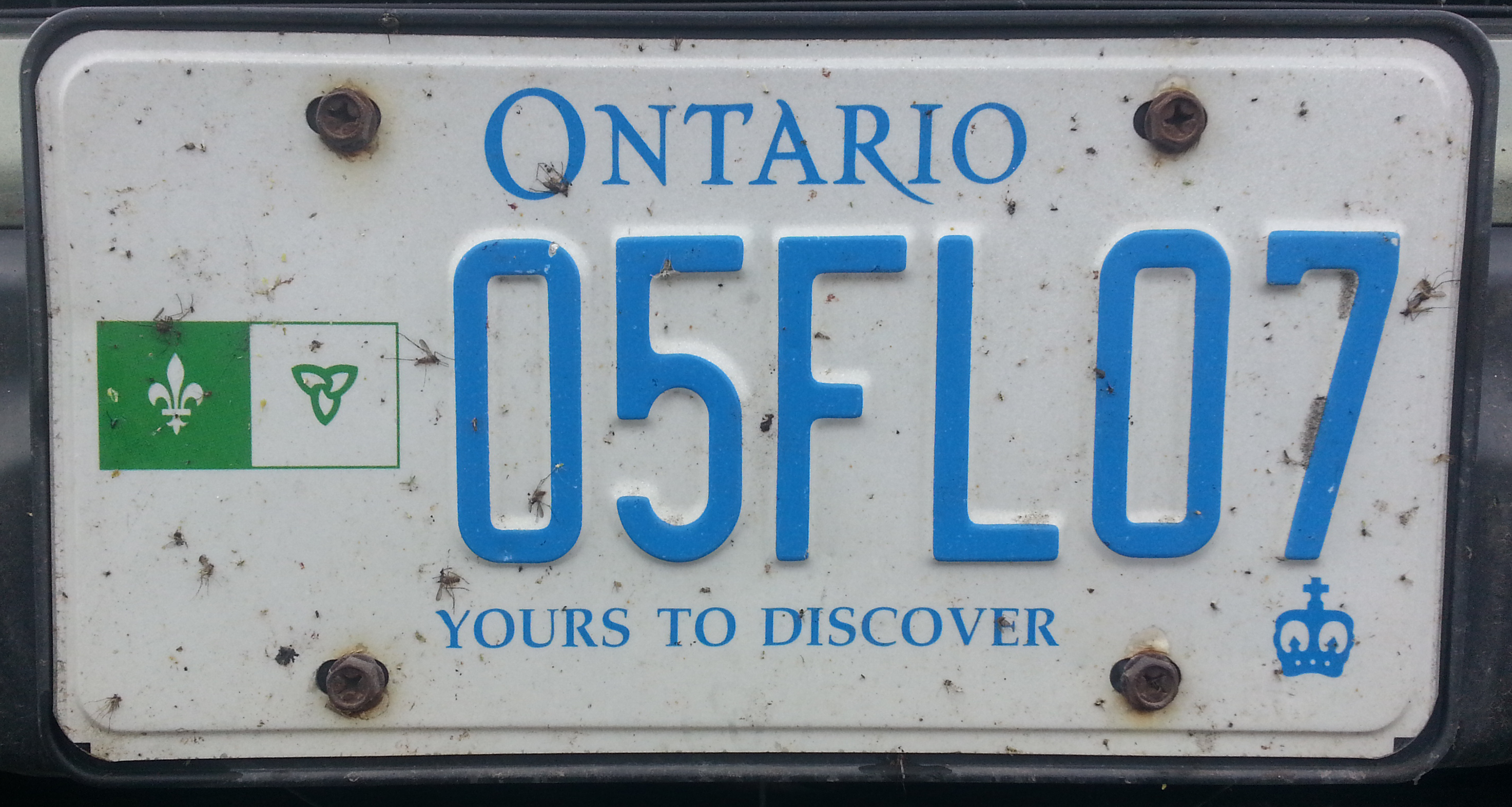
Personalized plate bearing the image of the Franco-Ontarian flag. Uncommonly for this pattern, the marketing legend is in English.

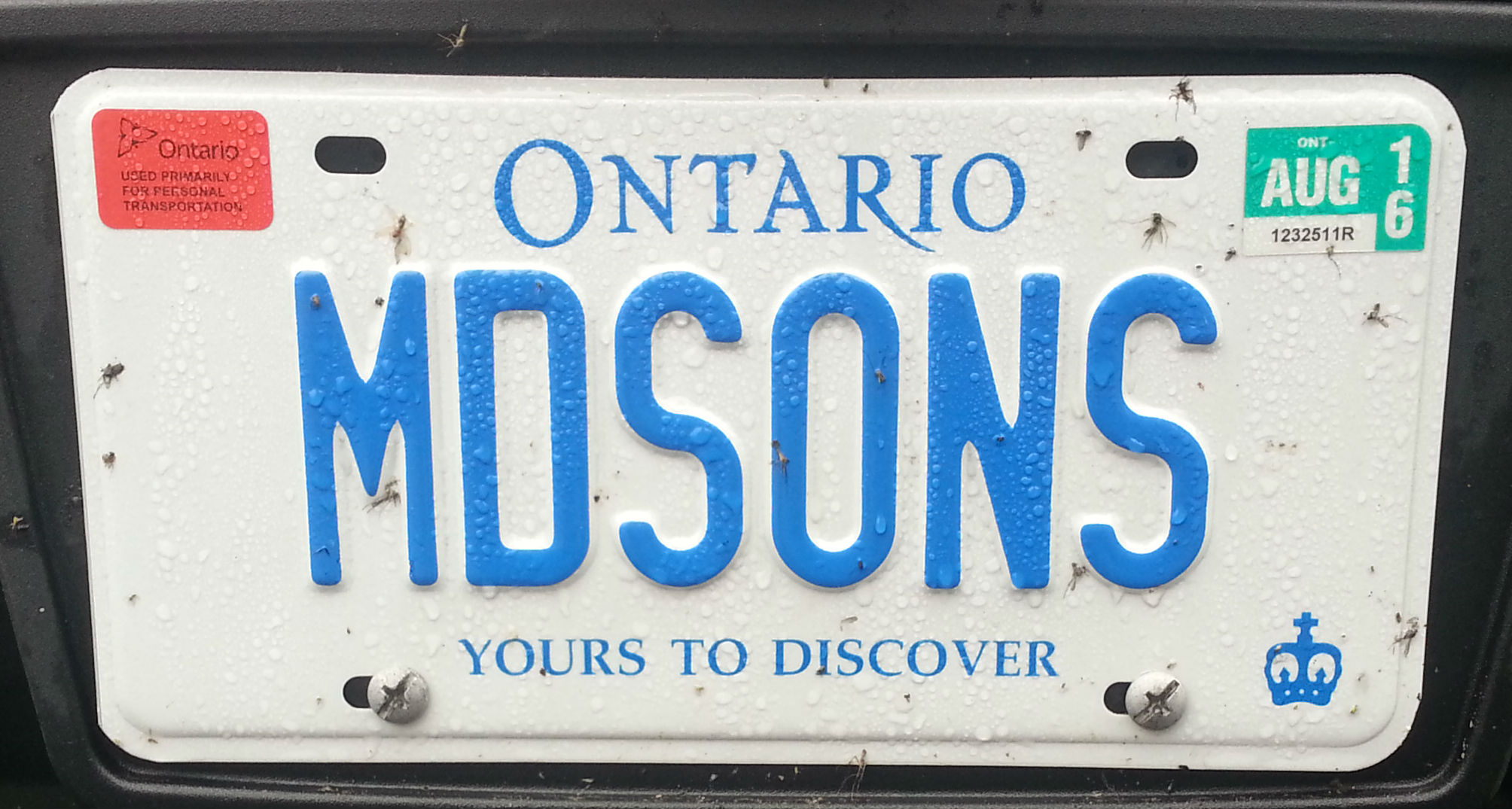
Personalized plate (front) attached to a pickup truck. As a pickup truck it should otherwise bear a black on white commercial plate, but the personalized plate is blue on white. Validation and "personal use" tags are affixed to the front plate, as in the case of other pickups.

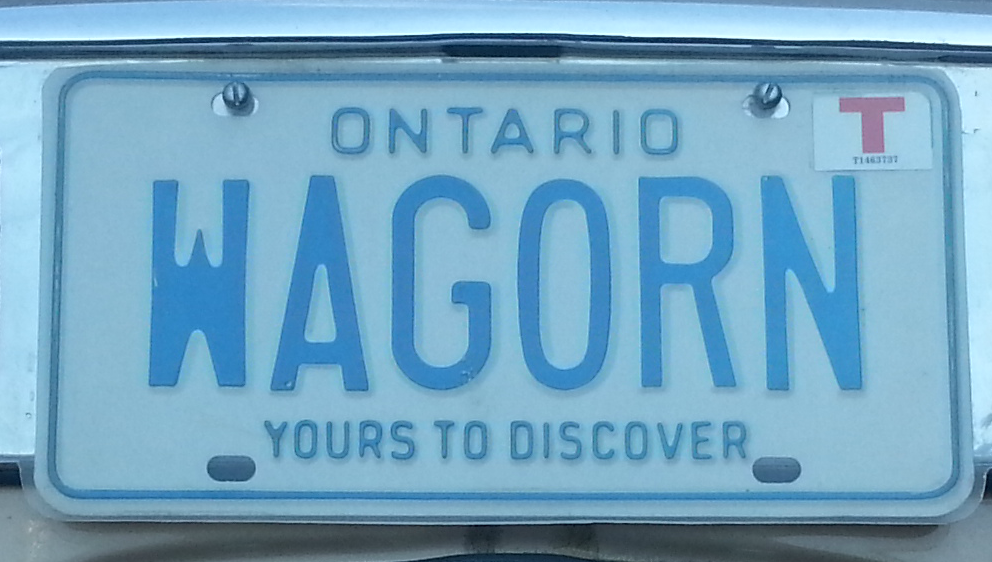
This personalised rear plate bears a temporary licence plate sticker. Temporary registration allows a "fit" and insured vehicle to be driven for ten days pending completion of the requirements for a regular registration.

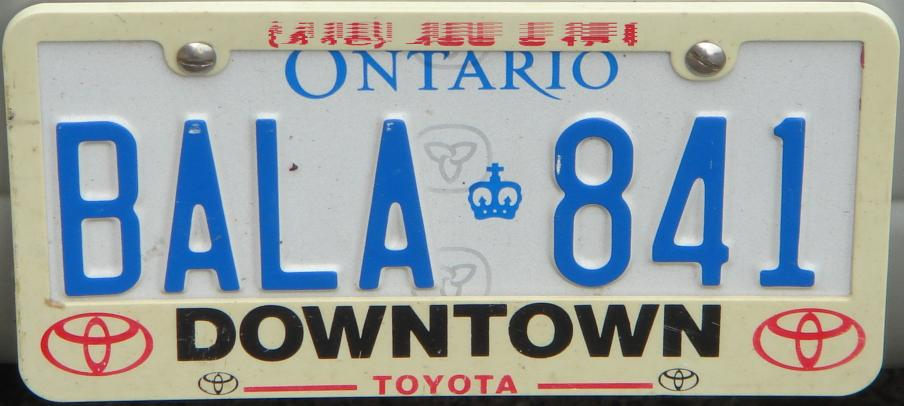
The "YOURS TO DISCOVER" slogan can be covered by the below of the dealer's logo at times.

=== Veteran plate ===
Image	First issued	Description	Slogan	Serial format	Serials issued	Notes
	2003	Blue on reflective white with graphic to the left; "ONTARIO" screened in blue centred at top with crown in bottom right	"YOURS TO DISCOVER"	1V2345	1V0001 to 9V1431 (as of October 31, 2025)	Applicants must confirm their eligibility through the Royal Canadian Legion. Numbers are assigned in format if no personalized message selected.
	2003	Blue on reflective white with graphic to the left; "ONTARIO" screened in blue centred at top with crown in bottom right	"TANT À DÉCOUVRIR"	1F2345	A69F to D85V (as of March 2, 2025)	Applicants must confirm their eligibility through the Royal Canadian Legion. Numbers are assigned in format if no personalized message selected.
	2011	Motorcycle Plate	A12B	1F0166 to 1F0180 (as of September 28, 2025)		Applicants must confirm their eligibility through the Royal Canadian Legion. Numbers are assigned in format if no personalized message selected.

=== License plate graphics ===
Plates with graphics are also available. Graphics first being issued on license plates began in 1996. The variety of graphics includes charities, universities, community organizations and popular Ontario sports teams, such as the Ottawa Senators. All plates offer the French slogan since 2017.

Image	First issued	Type	Category	Description	Slogan	Serial format	Serials issued	Notes
	1998	Ontario Square and Round Dance Federation	Arts	Blue on reflective white with graphic to the left; "ONTARIO" screened in blue centred at top with crown in bottom right	"YOURS TO DISCOVER"	12SQ34	01SQ01 to 15SQ65 (As of June 1st 2022)	
		Breast Cancer Society of Canada	Charity	Blue on reflective white with graphic to the left; "ONTARIO" screened in blue centred at top with crown in bottom right	"YOURS TO DISCOVER"	12BC34		
		Canadian Tire Jumpstart Charities	Charity	Blue on reflective white with graphic to the left; "ONTARIO" screened in blue centred at top with crown in bottom right	"YOURS TO DISCOVER"	12JS34		
	2007	Farley Foundation	Charity	Blue on reflective white with graphic to the left; "ONTARIO" screened in blue centred at top with crown in bottom right	"YOURS TO DISCOVER"	12FF34		
	2015	MADD Canada (Mother's Against Drunk Driving)	Charity	Blue on reflective white with graphic to the left; "ONTARIO" screened in blue centred at top with crown in bottom right	"YOURS TO DISCOVER"	12MD34	01MD01 to 03MD88 (As of April 30, 2022)	
	2009	St. John Ambulance	Charity	Blue on reflective white with graphic to the left; "ONTARIO" screened in blue centred at top with crown in bottom right	"YOURS TO DISCOVER"	12SJ34		
	2007	48th Highlanders	Community Organizations	Blue on reflective white with graphic to the left; "ONTARIO" screened in blue centred at top with crown in bottom right	"YOURS TO DISCOVER"	12TH34		
	2006	Army Cadet League of Canada (Ontario)	Community Organizations	Blue on reflective white with graphic to the left; "ONTARIO" screened in blue centred at top with crown in bottom right	"YOURS TO DISCOVER"	12AL34		
	2006	Association of Canadian Distillers	Community Organizations	Blue on reflective white with graphic to the left; "ONTARIO" screened in blue centred at top with crown in bottom right	"YOURS TO DISCOVER"	12CD34	01CD01 to 09CD57 (As of May 30, 2022)	
	2007	Canadian Blood Services	Community Organizations	Blue on reflective white with graphic to the left; "ONTARIO" screened in blue centred at top with crown in bottom right	"YOURS TO DISCOVER"	12BL34		
	1997	Elmer the Safety Elephant	Community Organizations	Blue on reflective white with graphic to the left; "ONTARIO" screened in blue centred at top with crown in bottom right	"YOURS TO DISCOVER"	12EE34		
	1998	Girl Guides of Canada	Community Organizations	Blue on reflective white with graphic to the left; "ONTARIO" screened in blue centred at top with crown in bottom right	"YOURS TO DISCOVER"	12GG34	01GG01 to 10GG28 (As of March 30, 2022)	
	2006	Governor General's Horse Guards Association	Community Organizations	Blue on reflective white with graphic to the left; "ONTARIO" screened in blue centred at top with crown in bottom right	"YOURS TO DISCOVER"	12HG34		
		Grand Lodge A.F. & A.M. of Canada	Community Organizations	Blue on reflective white with graphic to the left; "ONTARIO" screened in blue centred at top with crown in bottom right	"YOURS TO DISCOVER"	12FM34		
	1998	Grand Lodge of Ontario, Independent Order of Odd Fellows	Community Organizations	Blue on reflective white with graphic to the left; "ONTARIO" screened in blue centred at top with crown in bottom right	"YOURS TO DISCOVER"	12OF34		
	1998	Knights of Columbus	Community Organizations	Blue on reflective white with graphic to the left; "ONTARIO" screened in blue centred at top with crown in bottom right	"YOURS TO DISCOVER"	12VJ34		
	2001	Lincoln and Welland Regiment Foundation	Community Organizations	Blue on reflective white with graphic to the left; "ONTARIO" screened in blue centred at top with crown in bottom right	"YOURS TO DISCOVER"	12LW34		
	2006	Ottawa Valley Adventure Playground	Community Organizations	Blue on reflective white with graphic to the left; "ONTARIO" screened in blue centred at top with crown in bottom right	"YOURS TO DISCOVER"	12AP34		
	2005	Queens Own Rifles of Canada	Community Organizations	Blue on reflective white with graphic to the left; "ONTARIO" screened in blue centred at top with crown in bottom right	"YOURS TO DISCOVER"	12QO34		
	2006	Queen's York Rangers	Community Organizations	Blue on reflective white with graphic to the left; "ONTARIO" screened in blue centred at top with crown in bottom right	"YOURS TO DISCOVER"	12QR34		
	1996	Radio Amateurs of Canada	Community Organizations	Blue on reflective white with graphic to the left; "ONTARIO" screened in blue centred at top with crown in bottom right	"YOURS TO DISCOVER"	12HM34		
	2005	Rotary International	Community Organizations	Blue on reflective white with graphic to the left; "ONTARIO" screened in blue centred at top with crown in bottom right	"YOURS TO DISCOVER"	12RI34		
	2001	Royal Canadian Legion (Ontario Provincial Command)	Community Organizations	Blue on reflective white with graphic to the left; "ONTARIO" screened in blue centred at top with crown in bottom right	"YOURS TO DISCOVER"	12CL34		
	2006	Trillium Gift of Life Network	Community Organizations	Blue on reflective white with graphic to the left; "ONTARIO" screened in blue centred at top with crown in bottom right	"YOURS TO DISCOVER"	12GL34		Introduced to promote organ donation.
	2006	Royal Hamilton Light Infantry	Community Organizations	Blue on reflective white with graphic to the left; "ONTARIO" screened in blue centred at top with crown in bottom right	"YOURS TO DISCOVER"	12CA34		
	2006	Royal Regiment of Canada	Community Organizations	Blue on reflective white with graphic to the left; "ONTARIO" screened in blue centred at top with crown in bottom right	"YOURS TO DISCOVER"	12RG34	01RG01 to 02RG29 (As of May 30, 2022)	
	2005	Royal Regiment of Canadian Artillery	Community Organizations	Blue on reflective white with graphic to the left; "ONTARIO" screened in blue centred at top with crown in bottom right	"YOURS TO DISCOVER"	12AD34		
	1996	Scouts Canada	Community Organizations	Blue on reflective white with graphic to the left; "ONTARIO" screened in blue centred at top with crown in bottom right	"YOURS TO DISCOVER"	12SC34	01SC01 to 11SC61 (As of May 30, 2022)	
	1996	Shriners International	Community Organizations	Blue on reflective white with graphic to the left; "ONTARIO" screened in blue centred at top with crown in bottom right	"YOURS TO DISCOVER"	12SR34		
	2010	Support Our Troops	Community Organizations	Blue on reflective white with graphic to the left; "ONTARIO" screened in blue centred at top with crown in bottom right	"YOURS TO DISCOVER"	12YR34	01YR01 to 21YR66 (As of April 30, 2022)	Some money from the sale of the Yellow Ribbon plates is donated by the province to the Canadian Forces Personnel Assistance Fund to assist Canadian military veterans. The "yellow ribbon" design is indicated by the "YR" code.
	2006	Toronto Scottish Regiment	Community Organizations	Blue on reflective white with graphic to the left; "ONTARIO" screened in blue centred at top with crown in bottom right	"YOURS TO DISCOVER"	12TS34	01TS01 to 02TS38 (As of May 30, 2022)	
	2006	Ducks Unlimited	Environment	Blue on reflective white with graphic to the left; "ONTARIO" screened in blue centred at top with crown in bottom right	"YOURS TO DISCOVER"	12DU34	01DU01 to 14DU05 (As of January 30, 2022)	
	1998	Ontario Federation of Anglers and Hunters	Environment	Blue on reflective white with graphic to the left; "ONTARIO" screened in blue centred at top with crown in bottom right	"YOURS TO DISCOVER"	12AH34		
	1998	Don't Drink and Drive	Government	Blue on reflective white with graphic to the left; "ONTARIO" screened in blue centred at top with crown in bottom right	"YOURS TO DISCOVER"	12DD34		
	2010	Flag of Ontario	Government	Blue on reflective white with graphic to the left; "ONTARIO" screened in blue centred at top with crown in bottom right	"YOURS TO DISCOVER"	12ON34	01ON01 to 03ON53 (As of December 31, 2018)	
	1996	Road Safety	Government	Blue on reflective white with graphic to the left; "ONTARIO" screened in blue centred at top with crown in bottom right	"YOURS TO DISCOVER"	12RS34		
	1998	Anishinabek Nation	Heritage / Historical	Blue on reflective white with graphic to the left; "ONTARIO" screened in blue centred at top with crown in bottom right	"YOURS TO DISCOVER"	12AN34	01AN01 to 18AN81 (As of October 31, 2021)	
	1997	Canadian Flag	Heritage / Historical	Blue on reflective white with graphic to the left; "ONTARIO" screened in blue centred at top with crown in bottom right	"YOURS TO DISCOVER"	12CF34; 12FC34	01CF01 to 99CF99; 01FC01 to 11FC60 (As of March 31, 2022)	
	2005	Franco-Ontarian Flag (English)	Heritage / Historical	Blue on reflective white with graphic to the left; "ONTARIO" screened in blue centred at top with crown in bottom right	"YOURS TO DISCOVER"	12FL34	01FL01 to 06FL08 (As of July 1, 2014)	The English slogan plates start at 01FL01
	2009	Franco-Ontarian Flag (French)	Heritage / Historical	Blue on reflective white with graphic to the left; "ONTARIO" screened in blue centred at top with crown in bottom right	"TANT A DECOUVRIR"	12FL34	50FL01 to 64FL14 (As of July 1, 2021)	The French slogan plates start at 50FL01
	2023	Garden River First Nation	Heritage / Historical	Blue on reflective white with graphic to the left; "ONTARIO" screened in blue centred at top with crown in bottom right	"YOURS TO DISCOVER"	12GR34	01GR01 to 01GR28 (As of May 25, 2026)	Only available for purchase through the Garden River First Nation band office.
	1996	Loon	Heritage / Historical	Blue on reflective white with graphic to the left; "ONTARIO" screened in blue centred at top with crown in bottom right	"YOURS TO DISCOVER"	12LN34 (1996); 12LM34 (2002)	01LN01 to 99LN99; 01LM01 to 61LM13 (As of July 1, 2021)	
	2006	Nishnawbe Aski Nation	Heritage / Historical	Blue on reflective white with graphic to the left; "ONTARIO" screened in blue centred at top with crown in bottom right	"YOURS TO DISCOVER"	12NA34	01NA01 to 01NA82 (As of March 1, 2022)	
	1996	Trillium	Heritage / Historical	Blue on reflective white with graphic to the left; "ONTARIO" screened in blue centred at top with crown in bottom right	"YOURS TO DISCOVER"	12TR34 (1996); 12TL34 (2004)	01TR01 to 99TR99; 01TL01 to 40TL37 (As of February 1, 2021)	
	2013	United Empire Loyalists' Association of Canada	Heritage / Historical	Blue on reflective white with graphic to the left; "ONTARIO" screened in blue centred at top with crown in bottom right	"YOURS TO DISCOVER"	12UE34		Last batch of plates were ordered in June 2018. Remaining plates available while supply lasts at ServiceOntario.
	1996	Heart	Novelty	Blue on reflective white with graphic to the left; "ONTARIO" screened in blue centred at top with crown in bottom right	"YOURS TO DISCOVER"	12RH34		
	1996	I Heart	Novelty	Blue on reflective white with graphic to the left; "ONTARIO" screened in blue centred at top with crown in bottom right	"YOURS TO DISCOVER"	12LV34		
	1998	Fire Service Society	Professional	Blue on reflective white with graphic to the left; "ONTARIO" screened in blue centred at top with crown in bottom right	"YOURS TO DISCOVER"	12FD34 (1998) 12FS34 (2004) 12FR34 (2012) 12RF34 (2021)	01FD01 to 99FD99; 01FS01 to 99FS99; 01FR01 to 99FR99; 01RF01 to 10RF60 (As of July 31, 2022)	
	201X	Ontario Association of Veterinary Technicians	Professional	Blue on reflective white with graphic to the left; "ONTARIO" screened in blue centred at top with crown in bottom right	"YOURS TO DISCOVER"	12ME34		Plates can be purchased through the OAVT website.
	2005	Ontario Paramedic Association	Professional	Blue on reflective white with graphic to the left; "ONTARIO" screened in blue centred at top with crown in bottom right	"YOURS TO DISCOVER"	12PA34; 12EP34		Changed from PA to EP
	2008	Ontario Professional Fire Fighter Association (OPFFA)	Professional	Blue on reflective white with graphic to the left; "ONTARIO" screened in blue centred at top with crown in bottom right	"YOURS TO DISCOVER"	12PF34		Plates are only available through the OPFFA
	2011	Professional Engineers Ontario	Professional	Blue on reflective white with graphic to the left; "ONTARIO" screened in blue centred at top with crown in bottom right	"YOURS TO DISCOVER"	12PE34		
	2009	Equine Canada	Sports / Recreation	Blue on reflective white with graphic to the left; "ONTARIO" screened in blue centred at top with crown in bottom right	"YOURS TO DISCOVER"	12EC34	01EC01 to 07EC41 (As of November 30, 2021)	
	1996	Hamilton Tiger-Cats	Sports / Recreation	Blue on reflective white with graphic to the left; "ONTARIO" screened in blue centred at top with crown in bottom right	"YOURS TO DISCOVER"	12TC34	01TC01 to 21TC98 (As of May 9, 2022)	
	2006	International Ch’ang-Hon Taekwon-Do Federation	Sports / Recreation	Blue on reflective white with graphic to the left; "ONTARIO" screened in blue centred at top with crown in bottom right	"YOURS TO DISCOVER"	12TD34	01TD01 to 04TD75 (As of May 30, 2022)	
	1996	Ontario Federation of Snowmobile Clubs	Sports / Recreation	Blue on reflective white with graphic to the left; "ONTARIO" screened in blue centred at top with crown in bottom right	"YOURS TO DISCOVER"	12SN34	01SN01 to 27SN67 (As of May 1, 2015)	
	1996	Ontario Lacrosse Association	Sports / Recreation	Blue on reflective white with graphic to the left; "ONTARIO" screened in blue centred at top with crown in bottom right	"YOURS TO DISCOVER"	12LX34	01LX01 to 14LX35 (As of May 30, 2022)	
	2014	Ottawa REDBLACKS	Sports / Recreation	Blue on reflective white with graphic to the left; "ONTARIO" screened in blue centred at top with crown in bottom right	"YOURS TO DISCOVER"	12RB34	01RB01 to 03RB95 (As of September 30, 2021)	
	1996	Ottawa Senators	Sports / Recreation	Blue on reflective white with graphic to the left; "ONTARIO" screened in blue centred at top with crown in bottom right	"YOURS TO DISCOVER"	12SE34	01SE01 to 74SE07 (As of March 4, 2022)	
	1996	Toronto Argonauts	Sports / Recreation	Blue on reflective white with graphic to the left; "ONTARIO" screened in blue centred at top with crown in bottom right	"YOURS TO DISCOVER"	12AR34	01AR01 to 17AR96 (As of May 30, 2022)	
	1996	Toronto Blue Jays	Sports / Recreation	Blue on reflective white with graphic to the left; "ONTARIO" screened in blue centred at top with crown in bottom right	"YOURS TO DISCOVER"	12JA34	01JA01 to 94JA14 (As of February 28, 2022)	
	1996	Toronto Maple Leafs	Sports / Recreation	Blue on reflective white with graphic to the left; "ONTARIO" screened in blue centred at top with crown in bottom right	"YOURS TO DISCOVER"	12ML34 (1996); 12TO34 (2002); 12TM34 (2007)	01ML01 to 99ML99; 01TO01 to 99TO99; 01TM01 to 83TM74 (As of April 5, 2022)	
	1996	Toronto Raptors	Sports / Recreation	Blue on reflective white with graphic to the left; "ONTARIO" screened in blue centred at top with crown in bottom right	"YOURS TO DISCOVER"	12RA34	01RA01 to 54RA47 (As of May 9, 2022)	
	2005	Lakehead University	Universities / Colleges	Blue on reflective white with graphic to the left; "ONTARIO" screened in blue centred at top with crown in bottom right	"YOURS TO DISCOVER"	12LU34		
		George Brown College	Universities / Colleges	Blue on reflective white with graphic to the left; "ONTARIO" screened in blue centred at top with crown in bottom right	"YOURS TO DISCOVER"	12GB34		
	1996	Queen's University	Universities / Colleges	Blue on reflective white with graphic to the left; "ONTARIO" screened in blue centred at top with crown in bottom right	"YOURS TO DISCOVER"	12QU34	01QU01 to 14QU88 (As of February 16, 2022)	
	1997	University of Toronto	Universities / Colleges	Blue on reflective white with graphic to the left; "ONTARIO" screened in blue centred at top with crown in bottom right	"YOURS TO DISCOVER"	12UT34		
	2001	University of Waterloo	Universities / Colleges	Blue on reflective white with graphic to the left; "ONTARIO" screened in blue centred at top with crown in bottom right	"YOURS TO DISCOVER"	12UW34		Image depicts license plate with both a graphic element and a personalized registration.
	1996	Wilfrid Laurier University	Universities / Colleges	Blue on reflective white with graphic to the left; "ONTARIO" screened in blue centred at top with crown in bottom right	"YOURS TO DISCOVER"	12WL34		

=== Discontinued graphics ===
Certain graphics have been discontinued and are no longer issued. A plate design is considered discontinued once it is no longer offered at ServiceOntario.

Image	First issued	Discontinued	Type	Category	Description	Slogan	Serial format	Serials issued	Notes
	1996	2002	Star Trek	Arts / Entertainment	Blue on reflective white with graphic to the left; "ONTARIO" screened in blue centred at top with crown in bottom right	"YOURS TO DISCOVER"	12ST34		Discontinued due to licensing issues.
			Cadet Instructor Cadre	Community Organizations	Blue on reflective white with graphic to the left; "ONTARIO" screened in blue centred at top with crown in bottom right	"YOURS TO DISCOVER"	12IV34	01IV01 to 03IV30 (As of November 30, 2013)	
			Canadian Auxiliary Coast Guard	Community Organizations	Blue on reflective white with graphic to the left; "ONTARIO" screened in blue centred at top with crown in bottom right	"YOURS TO DISCOVER"	12CG34	01CG01 to 03CG32 (As of November 30, 2014)	
	1997	2020	Canadian National Sportsmen's Show	Community Organizations	Blue on reflective white with graphic to the left; "ONTARIO" screened in blue centred at top with crown in bottom right	"YOURS TO DISCOVER"	12NS34	01NS01 to 08NS10 (As of June 14, 2010)	
	2009		Canadian Snowbird Association	Community Organizations	Blue on reflective white with graphic to the left; "ONTARIO" screened in blue centred at top with crown in bottom right	"YOURS TO DISCOVER"	12CS34	01CS01 to 04CS13 (As of May 26, 2013)	
		2022	Geocaching	Community Organizations	Blue on reflective white with graphic to the left; "ONTARIO" screened in blue centred at top with crown in bottom right	"YOURS TO DISCOVER"	12GC34	01GC01 to 04GC05 (As of August 21, 2015)	
	1998		Humane Society	Community Organizations	Blue on reflective white with graphic to the left; "ONTARIO" screened in blue centred at top with crown in bottom right	"YOURS TO DISCOVER"	12HS34	01HS01 to 11HS82 (As of October 31, 2009)	
	2001	2018	Kawartha Lakes	Community Organizations	Blue on reflective white with graphic to the left; "ONTARIO" screened in blue centred at top with crown in bottom right	"YOURS TO DISCOVER"	12KL34		
	2009	2019	Lions Club	Community Organizations	Blue on reflective white with graphic to the left; "ONTARIO" screened in blue centred at top with crown in bottom right	"YOURS TO DISCOVER"	12LC34	01LC01 to 09LC60 (As of February 28, 2015)	
	2000		Millennium	Heritage / Historical	Blue on reflective white with graphic to the left; "ONTARIO" screened in blue centred at top with crown in bottom right	"YOURS TO DISCOVER"	12MM34	01MM01 to 14MM44 (As of February 28, 2009)	
	2009	2012	Niagara War of 1812	Heritage / Historical	Blue on reflective white with graphic to the left; "ONTARIO" screened in blue centred at top with crown in bottom right	"YOURS TO DISCOVER"	12NI34		
	2005	2010	Ottawa Renegades	Sports / Recreation	Blue on reflective white with graphic to the left; "ONTARIO" screened in blue centred at top with crown in bottom right	"YOURS TO DISCOVER"	12RR34		
	2007		Special Olympics	Sports / Recreation	Blue on reflective white with graphic to the left; "ONTARIO" screened in blue centred at top with crown in bottom right	"YOURS TO DISCOVER"	12SA34		
	1998	2005	Toronto SkyDome	Sports / Recreation	Blue on reflective white with graphic to the left; "ONTARIO" screened in blue centred at top with crown in bottom right	"YOURS TO DISCOVER"	12SD34	01SD01 to 08SD50 (As of April 30, 2022)	
	1997	2007	King's College	Universities / Colleges	Blue on reflective white with graphic to the left; "ONTARIO" screened in blue centred at top with crown in bottom right	"YOURS TO DISCOVER"	12KC34		
	1997	2005	University of Guelph	Universities / Colleges	Blue on reflective white with graphic to the left; "ONTARIO" screened in blue centred at top with crown in bottom right	"YOURS TO DISCOVER"	12UG34	01UG02 to 01UG51 (As of June 16, 2024)	
	1997	2005	York University	Universities / Colleges	Blue on reflective white with graphic to the left; "ONTARIO" screened in blue centred at top with crown in bottom right	"YOURS TO DISCOVER"	12YU34	04YU25 to 06YU37 (As of December 18, 2010)	

== Manufacturing ==
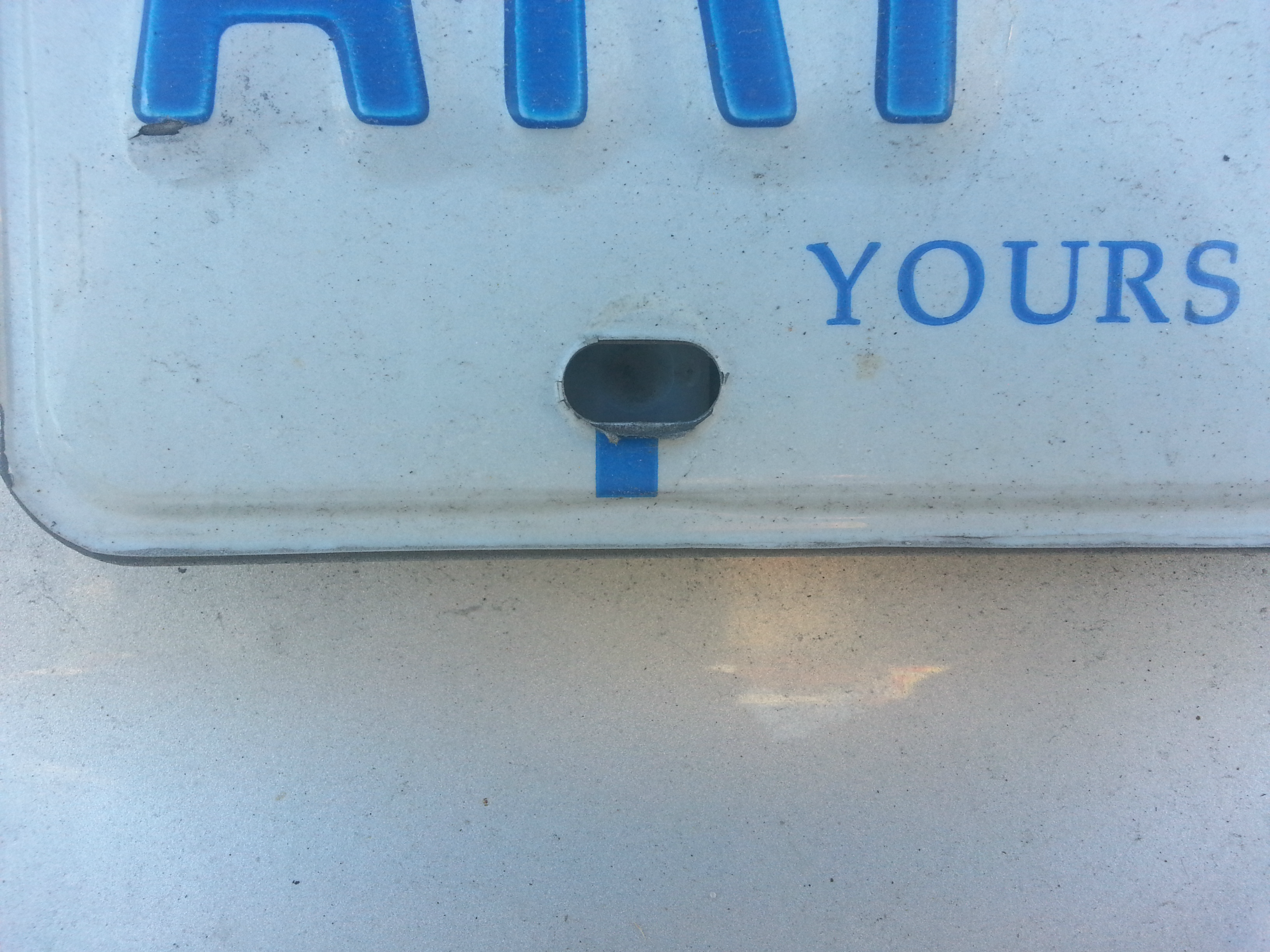
Since 1994, Ontario plates have had a reflective backing. Between 1999 and 2003, the backing was made by Avery. These can be recognized by the slogan written with smaller letters, and the presence of a registration mark below the bottom left bolt hole. Backing has since been made using 3M-brand reflective material.

Ontario licence plates were formerly manufactured by prison inmates at the Millbrook Correctional Centre in Cavan-Millbrook-North Monaghan. Upon Millbrook's closure in 2003, manufacture was moved to the Central East Correctional Centre in Lindsay, Ontario. Since 1991, all Ontario plates have been manufactured for the MTO by Trilcor Industries, owned by the province's Ministry of the Solicitor General. From 2017 to 2018, the plates were manufactured by Waldale Manufacturing of Nova Scotia, because Ontario's prison made plates ran out due to the peeling and bubbling in the preceding "B" series. The plates made by Trilcor Industries returned in 2018, to avoid license plate issues with the Nova Scotia license plates.

=== Alternative supplier ===
In 2016, an increase in the rate of defective plates combined with an increase in the number of registered vehicles led to the Ontario Ministry of Transportation becoming unable to keep up with demand for plates. It placed an order for 100,000 units from the Waldale Irwin Holdson Group, the largest licence plate manufacturer in North America. Plates are produced by the Waldale Manufacturing facility in Amherst, Nova Scotia.

Plates from the first batch of 35,000 can be identified due to the use of embossed letters and numbers from Nova Scotia plates, which differ in appearance from Ontarian fonts. The province continues to order supplementary batches of plates from Waldale. Since 2017, the Ontario die set has been in use. These plates are almost identical to those made by Trilcor Industries. The Waldale made plates have squared off edges and smaller bolt holes.

== Issues and controversies ==
=== Defective plates from 2012 ===
In 2012, reports began to appear of plates deteriorating earlier than otherwise expected. The reflective layers detached themselves from the metal plate, making the plate unreadable. Approximately 1% of licence plates issued have this defect. The defect has appeared in both front and rear plates. Trilcor Industries and the MTO offer a five-year warranty on plates and will replace the defective plates at no cost. Plate replacement for other reasons (theft, damage, wear, etc.) is done at a cost.

Conventional plates can be replaced "over-the-counter" at a licence office, but the complete process for personalized plates takes over six months.

Driving with an illegible plate is an offence punishable by fine, under the Highway Traffic Act.

In 2015, the Ministry of Community Safety and Correctional Services hired Canada's National Research Council to identify the root cause of licence plate de-lamination. The NRC's report indicated that the reflective material adhered poorly to the aluminium plates, and that embossing process stressed the materials to the point that the reflective layer would puncture and de-laminate. At that point, water and other contaminants could slip between the layers. Also, road de-icing materials contributed to the de-lamination. The report found that this problem was present in samples from all types of plates, except for motorcycle plates.

The report recommended that Trilcor work with its supplier of laminating layer to resolve the problem, and indicated that a thicker layer of material would likely perform better.

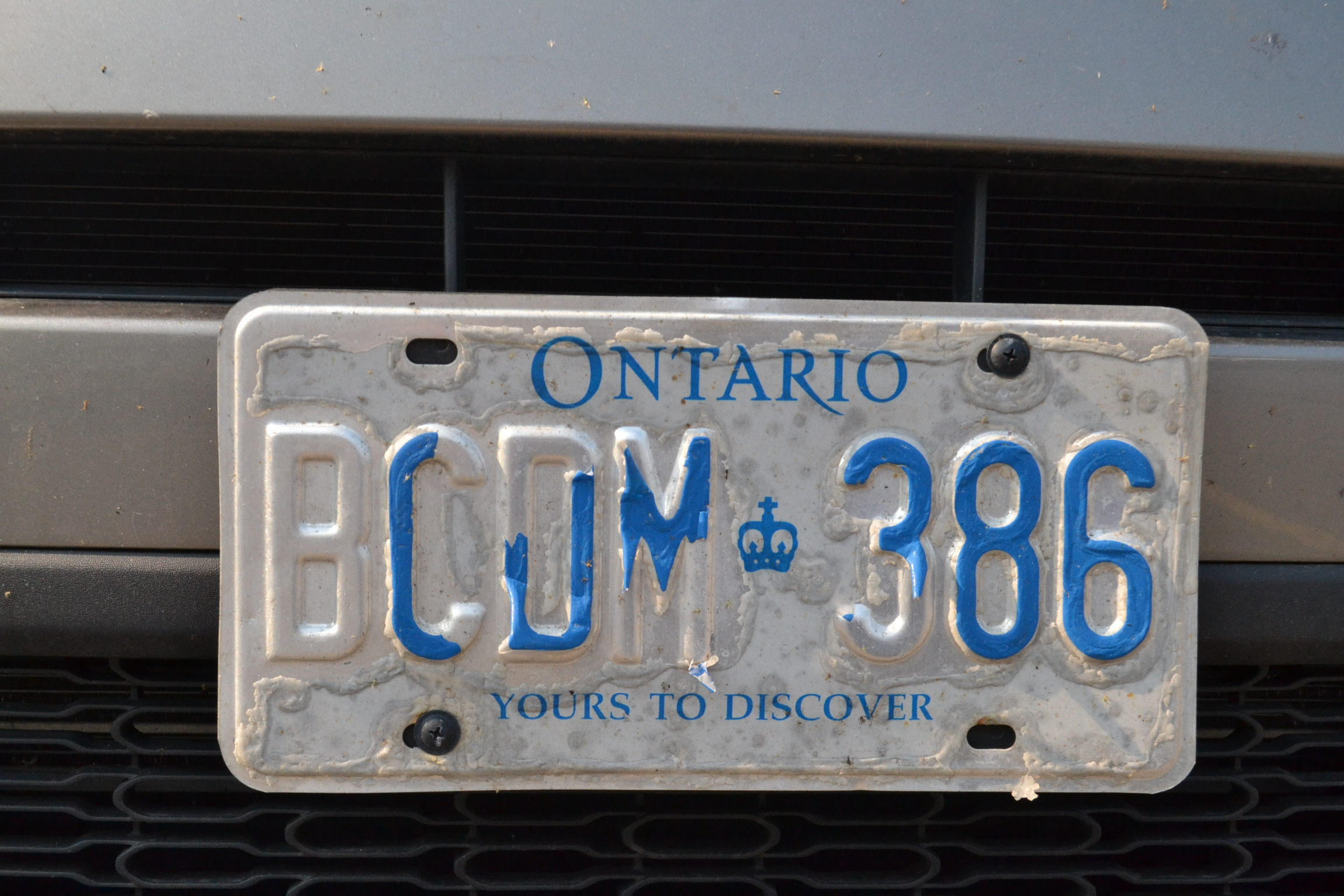
Example of early deterioration of a front Ontario licence plate.

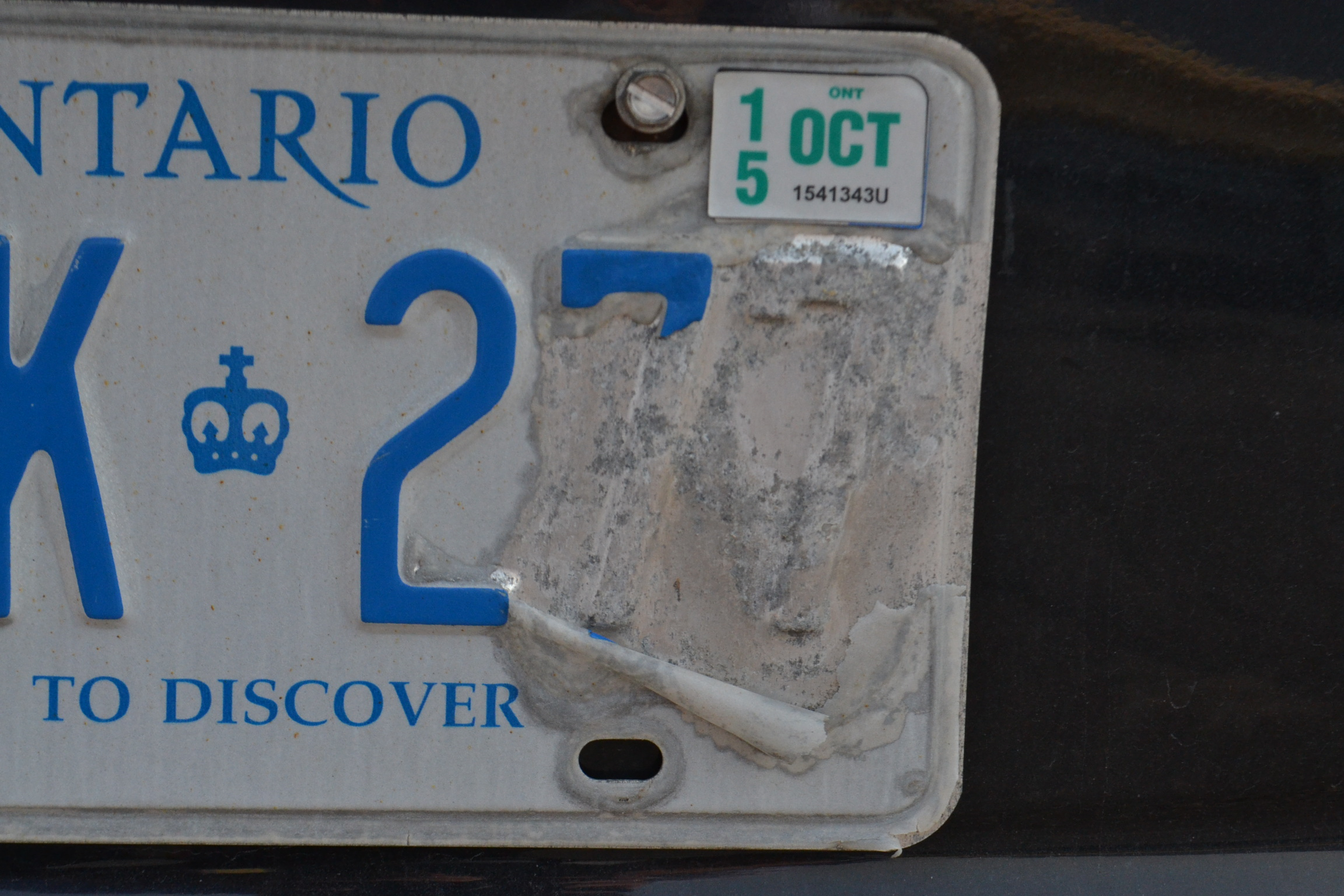
Early deterioration on a rear plate. The aluminum base is visible where the reflective layer has fallen off.

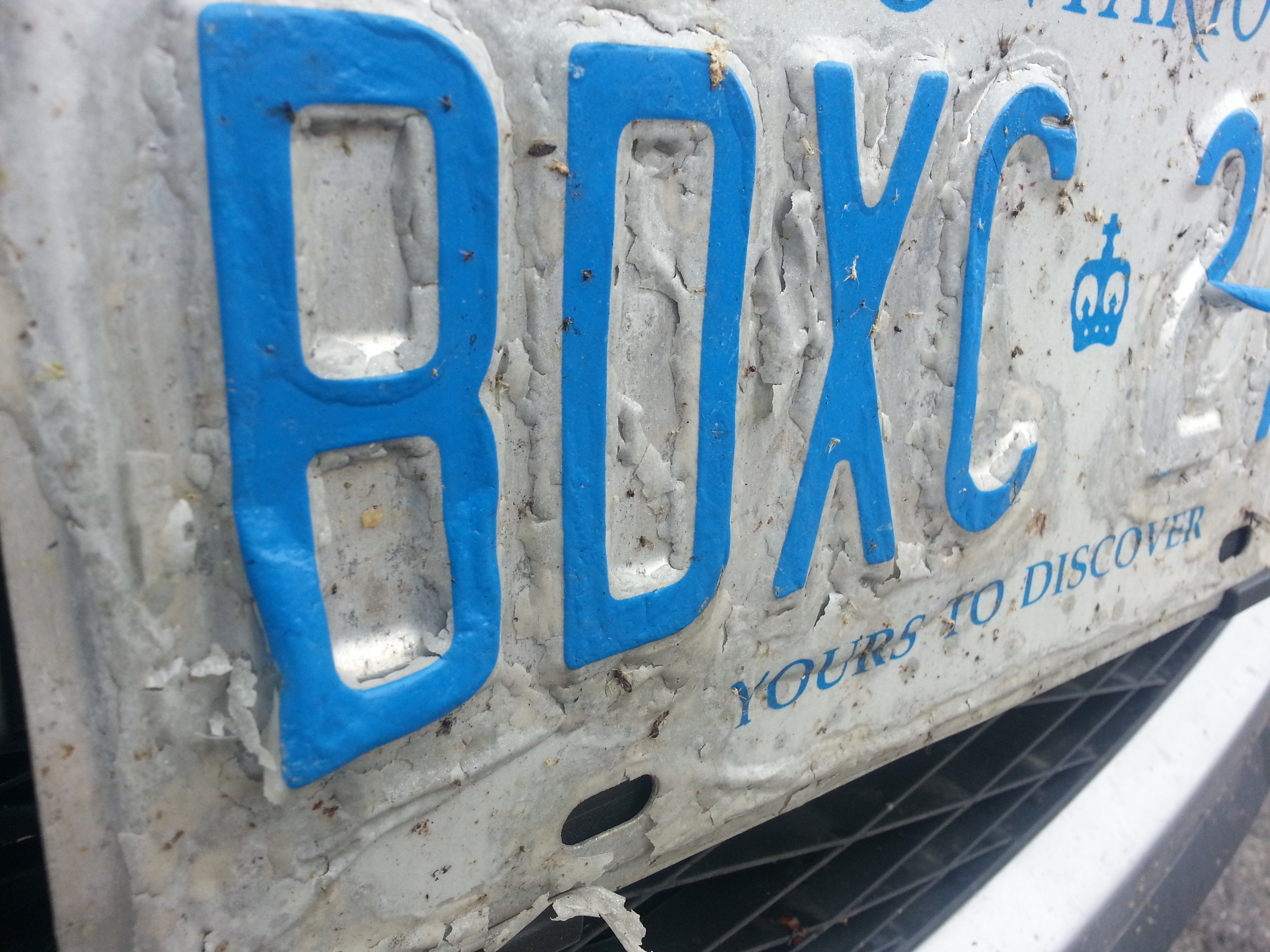
Close-up view of early damage to a front licence plate of an Ontario car. The reflective layer can be seen de-laminating and separating from the metal base.

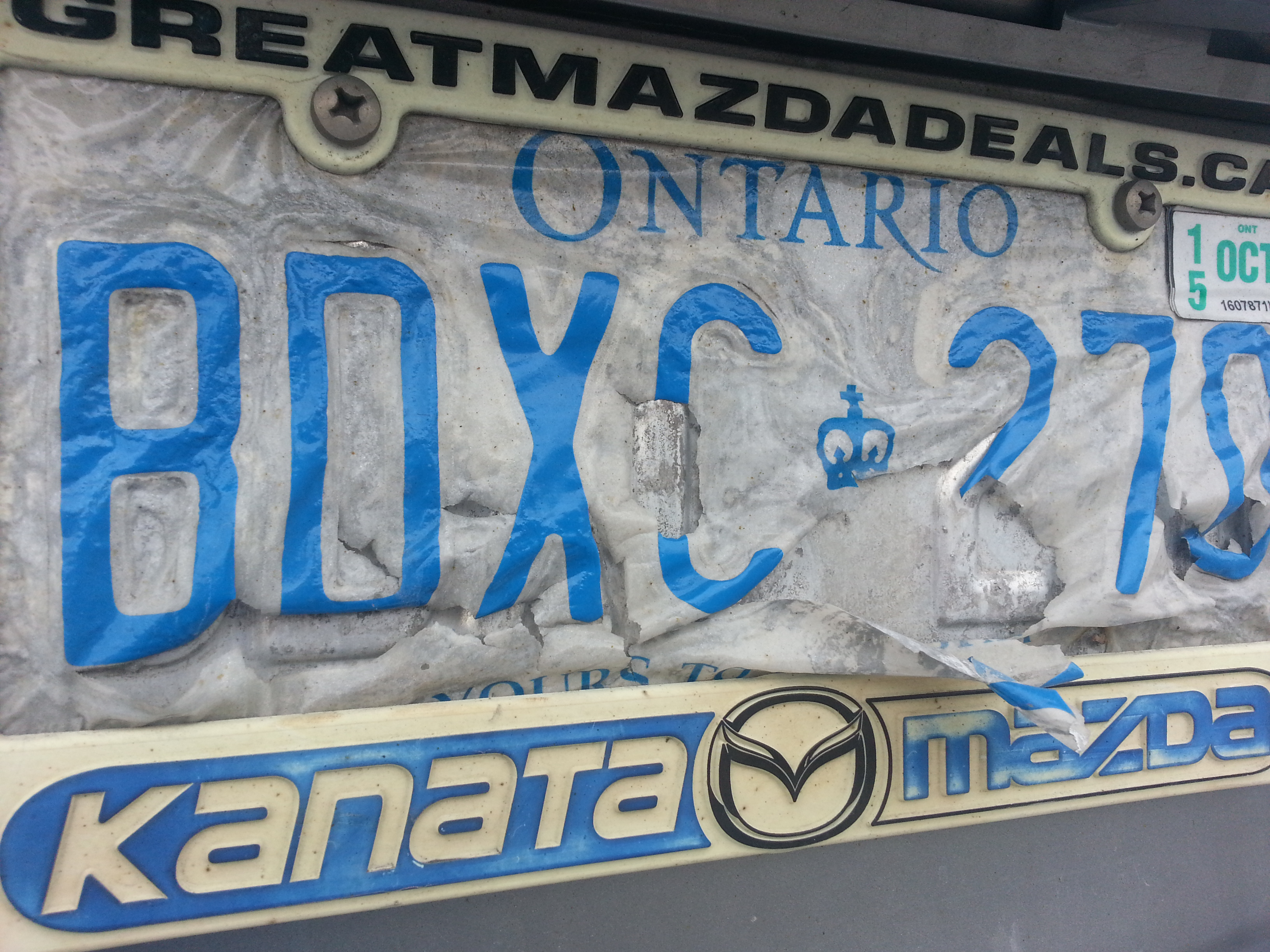
Close-up view of similar damage to the rear plate of the same car, indicating this problem is not confined to the front plates.

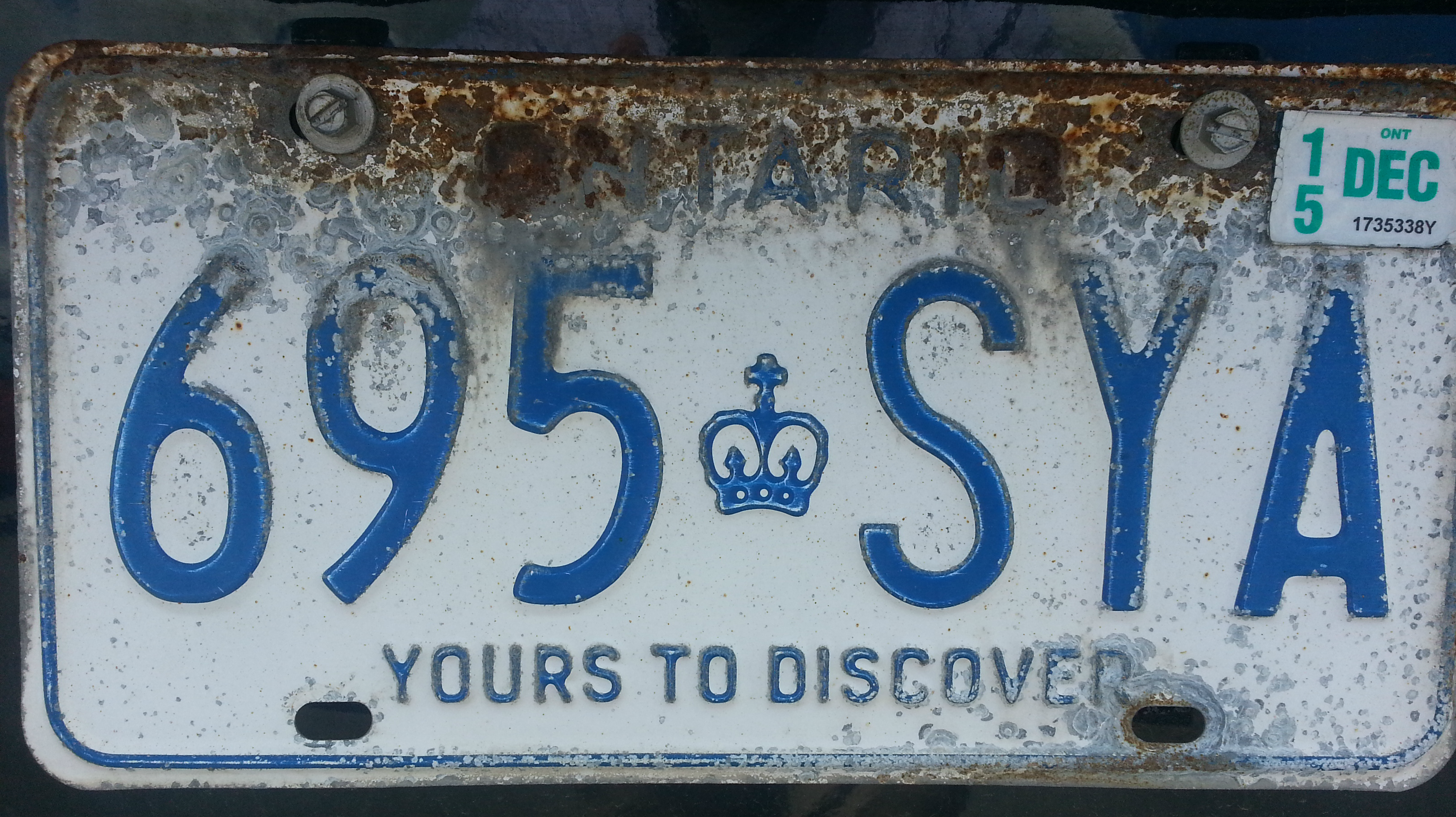
For comparison purposes, corrosion on this plate is due to age and wear, rather than a defective substrate.

=== Illegality of licence plate covers ===
Many vehicle owners place clear plastic covers over their licence plates to protect their already defective licence plates (2012) from premature deterioration. According to Ontario's Highway Traffic Act Section 13.2, licence plate covers are considered an obstruction and are illegal in the province of Ontario. In the rare event that the officer chooses to issue the citation, the offence carries a minimum fine of $85. On the contrary, drivers operating a motor vehicle with defective (i.e. unreadable) number plates can be charged with the same offence. This has left defective number plate owners with little choice but to obtain replacement plates from the MTO, orders which have taken months (or over six months for customised plates) to process.

Several motorists sought other solutions to prevent their number plates from deterioration, such as placing the front plate on the dashboard instead of affixing it to the front bumper. Others have omitted the front licence plate altogether since it is not uncommon to see out-of-province vehicles on Ontario roadways (many jurisdictions in North America, including neighbouring Quebec and Michigan, do not require front plates). In most cases, vehicle owners who attempted the aforementioned solutions were convicted of the same offence (HTA section 13.2).

=== Defective plates from 2020 ===
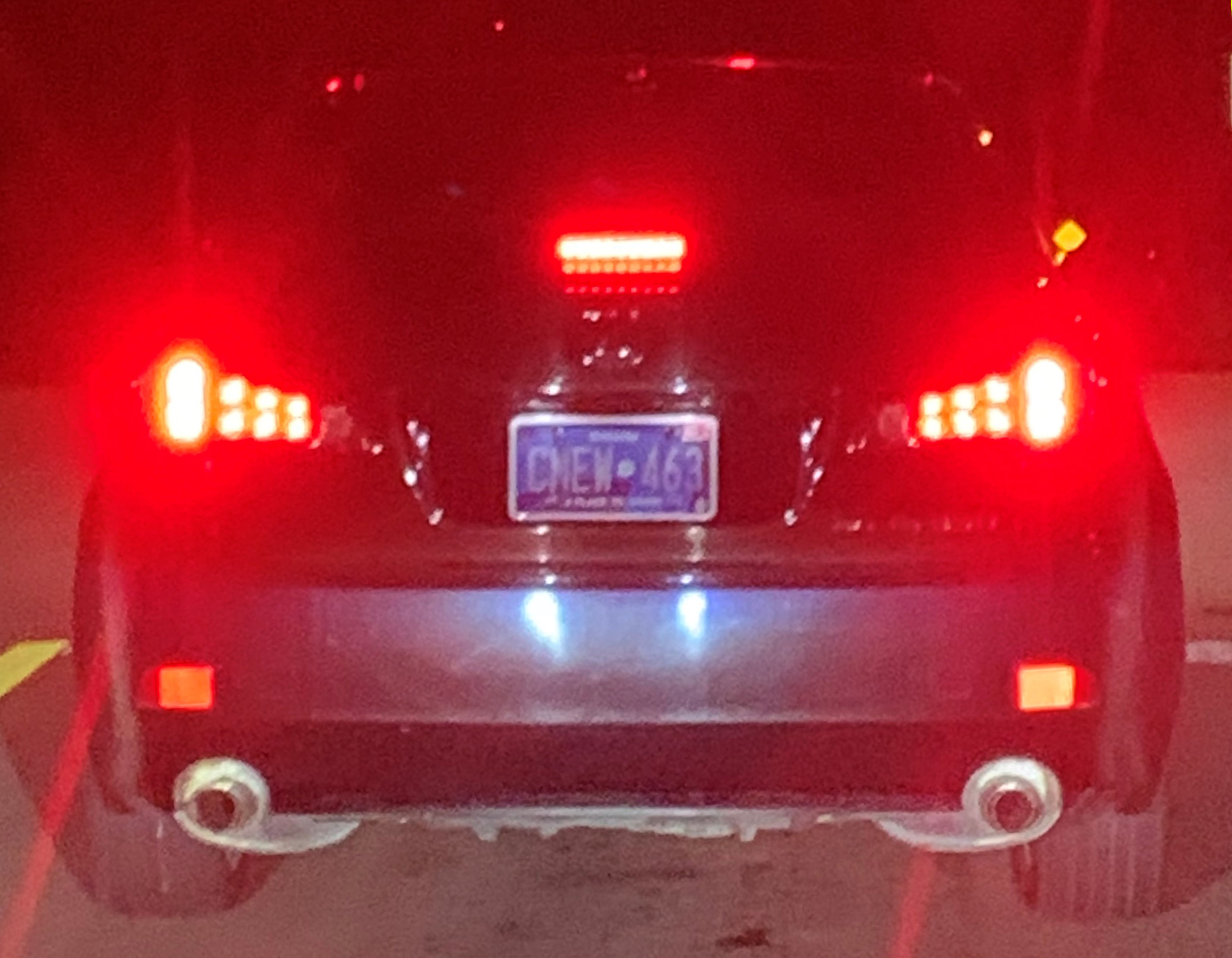
Recalled 2020 plate design that is difficult to read at night.

On 15 February 2020, two weeks after the province began issuing plates with the new design, off-duty Kingston Police Sergeant Steve Koopman posted a photo on Twitter showing a vehicle with the new plate at night, stating that "they're virtually unreadable at night". Government spokesperson Lisa Thompson, the Minister of Government and Consumer Services, stated in a news conference that the new design had undergone a "rigorous testing program", that the government had consulted with "key stakeholders" including law enforcement, and that the plates were not problematic. She also criticized the earlier "Liberal plates", referring to a batch of plates issued during a previous government that peeled. Thompson stated that manufacturing and quality control are the responsibility of 3M. The redesigned plates also caused problems for photo radar cameras, which have difficulty reading the name of the jurisdiction. The name is rendered in a smaller font size than earlier plates. The president of the Toronto Police Association stated that the organization had not been consulted on the new design.

The Ford Government had insisted for days that there was not an issue with the plates; however, on February 20, it announced that 3M would make an "enhanced licence plate" to be available in less than three weeks. On February 28, the government announced that the distribution of the defective plates would cease on March 4, that the enhanced plates would be ready by March 16 at "no cost to Ontario taxpayers", those who had already been issued the new plates will receive the enhanced version in the mail, and until the enhanced plates were ready, the government switched back to the previous plate design. This design was later scrapped on May 6.

=== Sticker renewal fee ===
On February 22, 2022, the Ontario Government eliminated licence plate renewal fees and the requirement to have a licence plate sticker for passenger vehicles, light-duty trucks, motorcycles and mopeds, effective March 13, 2022.

== See also ==
- Canadian veteran vehicle registration plates
- Canadian licence plate designs and serial formats
- Vehicle registration plates of Canada
