= Loke =

Loke may refer to:

== Surname ==
Luk or Loke is the Cantonese romanization of several (but not all) Chinese surnames that are romanized as Lu in Mandarin. It may refer to:

- Lu (surname 陆)
- Lu (surname 禄)
- Lu (surname 逯)
- Lu (surname 鹿)

== Places ==
- Loke, Krško, a settlement in Slovenia
- Loke, Nova Gorica, a dispersed settlement in Slovenia
- Loke, Straža, a settlement in Slovenia
- Loke, Tabor, a dispersed settlement in Slovenia
- Loke pri Mozirju, a settlement in Slovenia
- Loke pri Planini, a settlement in Slovenia
- Loke pri Zagorju, a settlement in Slovenia
- Loke v Tuhinju, a village in Slovenia
- Spodnje Loke, a settlement in Slovenia
- Zgornje Loke, a settlement in Slovenia
- Mount Loke, a mountain in Antarctica

== Other uses ==
- an alternative spelling of Loki, a god in Norse mythology
- 4862 Loke, an asteroid
- HSwMS Loke, the name of several ships
- Loke Viking, an anchor handling tug supply vessel
- Ulmus × hollandica 'Loke', an elm cultivar
- Loke, a fictional character in the manga and anime series Fairy Tail

== See also ==
- Løke, a surname
