= Vanity plate =

Custom license plates

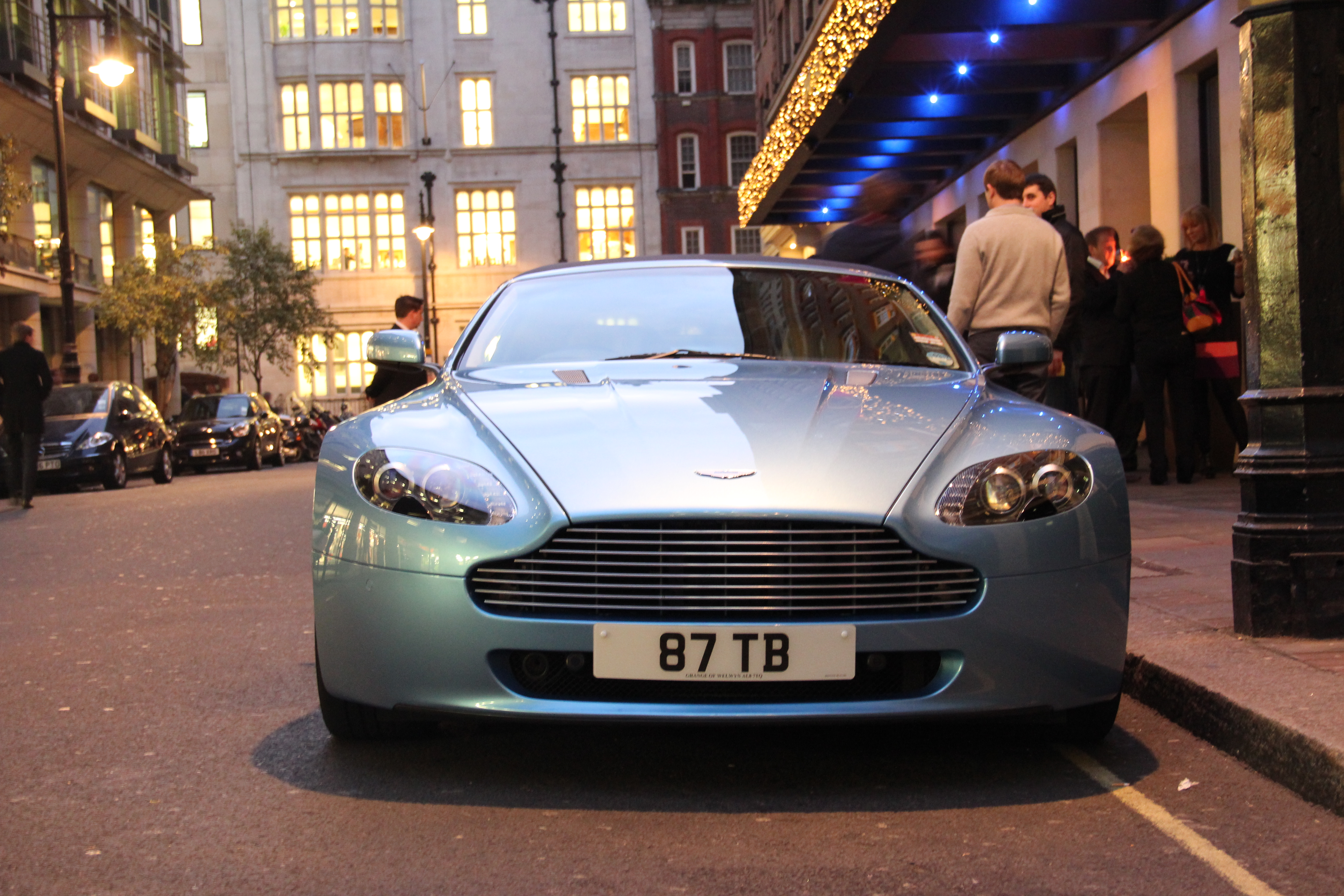
A car parked in London with an unusual personalized licence plate (pictured above is Shmee150's Aston Martin Vantage Roadster)

A vanity plate (Note: Also known as a personalized plate (United States and Canada); prestige plate, private number plate, cherished plate or personalised registration (United Kingdom); personalised plate (Australia, New Zealand, and United Kingdom); or custom plate (Canada, Australia and New Zealand).) is a special type of vehicle registration plate on an automobile or other vehicle. The owner of the vehicle pays extra money to have their own choice of numbers or letters, usually portraying a recognizable phrase, slogan, or abbreviation, on their plate. Sales of vanity plates are often a significant source of revenue for North American provincial and state licensing agencies. In some jurisdictions, such as British Columbia, vanity plates have a different color scheme and design.

== North America ==
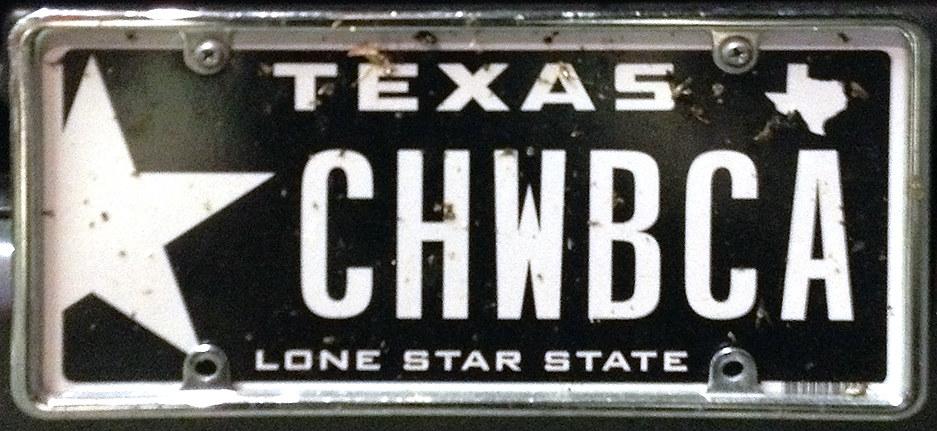
A vanity plate in Amarillo, Texas, referencing the Star Wars character Chewbacca.

Vanity plates are issued by every U.S. state and the District of Columbia, and every Canadian province except Newfoundland and Labrador.

In 2007, the American Association of Motor Vehicle Administrators (AAMVA) and Stefan Lonce, author of License to Roam: Vanity License Plates and the Stories They Tell, conducted North America's first state by state and province by province survey of vanity plates, revealing that there are 9.7 million vehicles with personalized vanity license plates. The survey ranked jurisdictions by "vanity plate penetration rate", which is the percentage of registered motor vehicles that are vanitized. Virginia has the highest U.S. vanity plate penetration rate (16.19%), followed by New Hampshire (13.99%), Illinois (13.41%), Nevada (12.73%), Montana (9.8%), Maine (9.7%), Connecticut (8.14%), New Jersey (6.8%), North Dakota (6.5%) and Vermont (6.1%). Texas had the lowest vanity plate penetration rate (0.5%). Virginia's high rate of vanity plates, in particular, was attributed to the low cost per annum compared to a standard plate: the state charges $10 more for vanity plates than for state-issued plates, compared to $50 more in Maryland and Texas, and $100 more in Washington, D.C. According to the Federal Highway Administration, in 2005 there were 242,991,747 privately owned and commercial registered automobiles, trucks, and motorcycles in the U.S., and 3.83% of eligible U.S. vehicles have vanity plates.

Ontario had the highest Canadian vanity plate penetration rate (4.59%), followed by Saskatchewan (2.69%), Manitoba (1.96%), the Yukon (1.79%), and the Northwest Territories (1.75%). British Columbia had the lowest vanity plate penetration rate (0.59%) among those provinces that issue vanity plates. According to Statistics Canada, in 2006 there were 14,980,046 registered motor vehicles (excluding buses, trailers, and off-road, farm and construction vehicles) in the provinces and territories that issue vanity plates, and 2.94% of eligible Canadian vehicles have vanity plates.

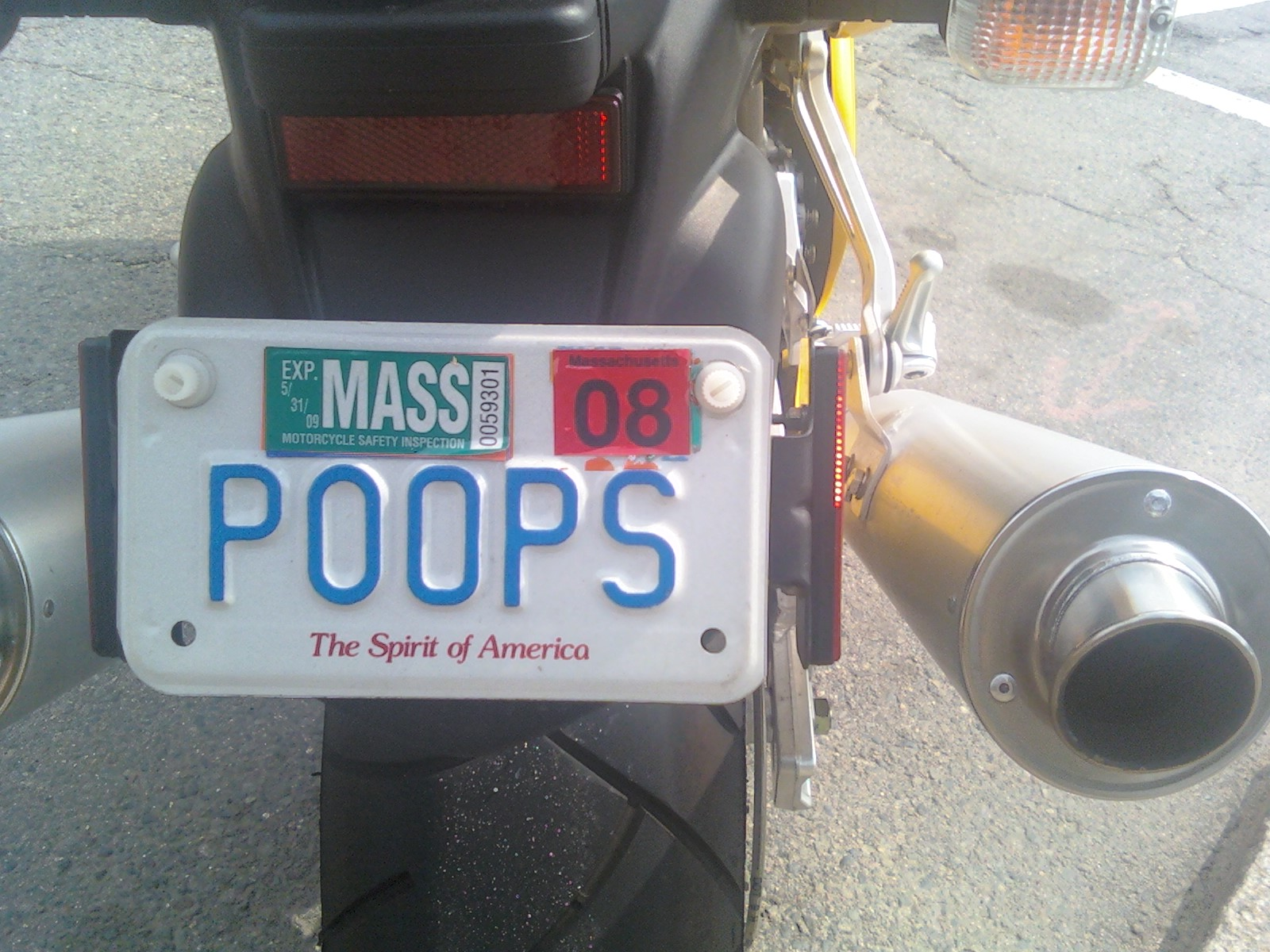
Massachusetts vanity plate on a motorcycle in Boston.

In some states and provinces, optional plates can also be vanity plates and are a choice of motorists who want a more distinctive personalised plate. However, the maximum number of characters on an optional plate may be lower than on a standard-issue plate. For example, the U.S. state of Virginia allows up to 7.5 characters (a space or hyphen is counted as 0.5 character) on a standard-issue plate, but only up to 6 characters on many of its optional plates. In some states, a motorist may also check the availability of a desired combination online. In New Jersey, which uses six alphanumeric characters on its plates, drivers can order vanity plates with seven characters.

All U.S. states and Canadian provinces that issue vanity plates have a "blue list" of vanity plates that contains banned words, phrases, or letter/number combinations. The U.S. state of Florida, for example, has banned such plates as "PIMPALA", while the state of New York bans any plates with the letters "FDNY", "NYPD", or "GOD", among others. Often the ban is to eliminate confusion with plates used on governmental vehicles or plates used on other classes of vehicles. However, a licensing authority's discretion to deny or revoke "offensive" vanity plates is finite, as some U.S. motorists have successfully sued their state governments on that issue under the First Amendment to the United States Constitution. The "blue list" is not definitive; in general, the agent processing an application for a vanity plate can reject a plate if it is deemed offensive, even if the phrase does not match a banned word exactly. State DMVs have received complaints about offensive vanity plates. In this case, the DMV can revoke a plate if it is deemed offensive, even if it had been previously approved. The "blue list" may be limited to genuine vanity plates, not covering computer-generated accidents. For example, Florida's famous "A55 RGY" license plate (with the standard drawing of an orange in the middle) looks like "ASS ORGY". The state of Georgia banned the word "covfefe", a misspelling of the word "coverage" that was coined by U.S. President Donald Trump on his Twitter to its customized plates. More recently, New York banned "BLANK" after a New York City woman who had registered that plate (which reflected her maiden name) mistakenly received over $40,000 in parking tickets in which the license plate was left blank.

== United Kingdom ==
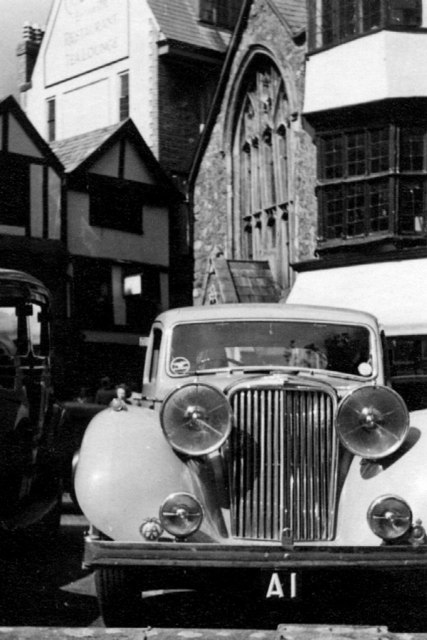
A Jaguar Mark IV car, registered under A1, parked in Cathedral Close, Exeter, May 1948. This registration was issued in 1903 and has since had a variety of owners and used on many vehicles.

In the United Kingdom, number plates are issued by the Driver and Vehicle Licensing Agency (DVLA). They do not approve personalised registrations (often also called private number plates and cherished number plates in the UK) if they contain words which are offensive in any widely used language. One registration to slip the net was PEN 15. The DVLA however lately have released more and more previously banned combinations such as SEX and DAM. UK plates have to match certain very strict letter/number combinations: see vehicle registration plates of the United Kingdom.

Registrations can be sold, or transferred from one vehicle to another, with some restrictions. Registrations can also be held on a retention document issued by the DVLA, this is perfect for dealers or if the owner is in between vehicles. Only the registered owner/registered keeper of the vehicle can be awarded the V778 Retention Document when making an online application. However, the V317 form (postal application) allows the number to be retained in someone else's name (allocating them as new Grantee) on the issued V778 retention document so the seller can transfer the plate to whoever is receiving the private number plate. Usually the Cherished Number Agent handling the sale will arrange all this for the seller making it hassle free. The trade of number plates was started by private dealers, entrepreneurs who saw an opportunity to sell something in demand. Originally, the only vanity plates allowed to be transferred were ordinary registrations that had been transferred. The DVLA began selling personalised registrations unrelated to the registration districts in 1989. More than 4.2 million registrations were sold during the first 25 years of this initiative, raising over £2 billion for the UK Treasury.

There is some additional flexibility available by using numbers that resemble letters (e.g., S for 5), or by using large black, yellow or white headed screws to fix the plate to the car to fill in or create a gap (e.g. in the middle of "H" to make it look like two 1s or Is, or vice versa: two 1s made into an H with a black screw head). However, the font style, size and spacing is mandated by law, making the practice illegal. The font that is used on all new number plates is the Charles Wright 2001 version of the Mandatory typeface, and was first introduced in September 2001 to coincide with the DVLA release of new style DVLA number plates.

== Other countries/territories ==
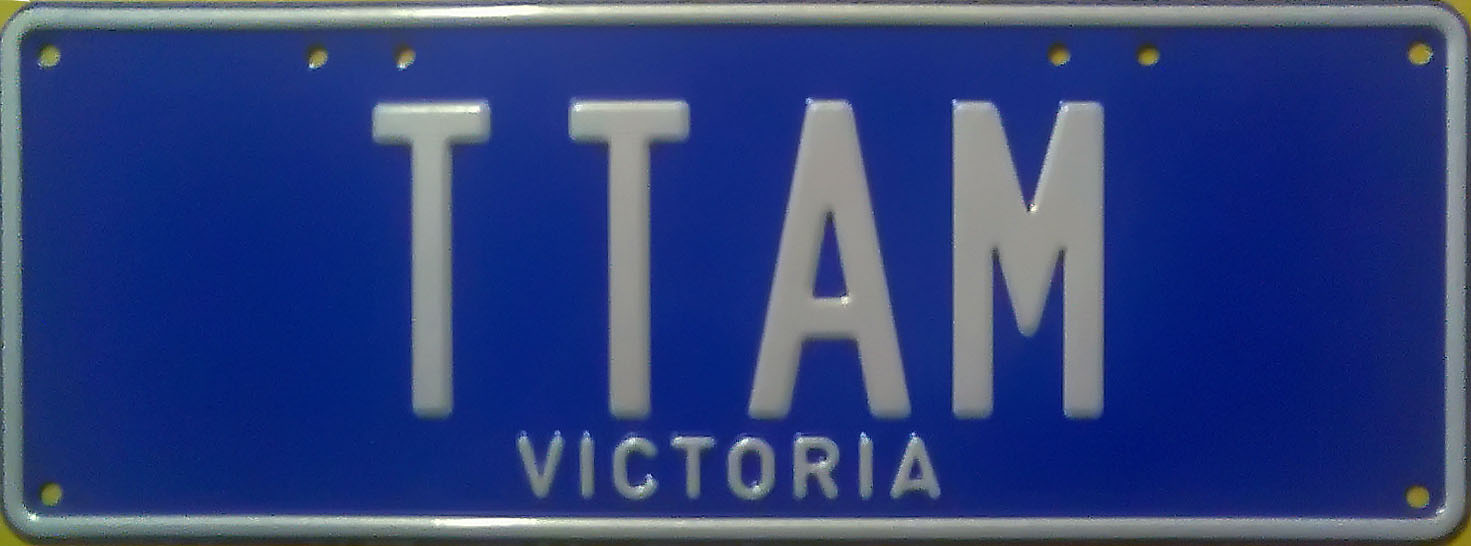
A custom plate from Victoria, Australia.

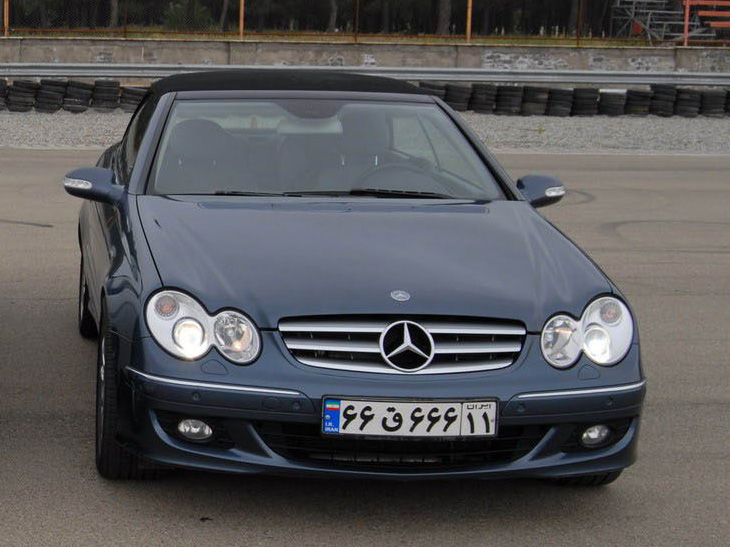
A custom plate from Shemiran, Tehran, Iran which reads 66Q666/Iran 11 (Persian: ۶۶۶ق۶۶/ایران ۱۱).

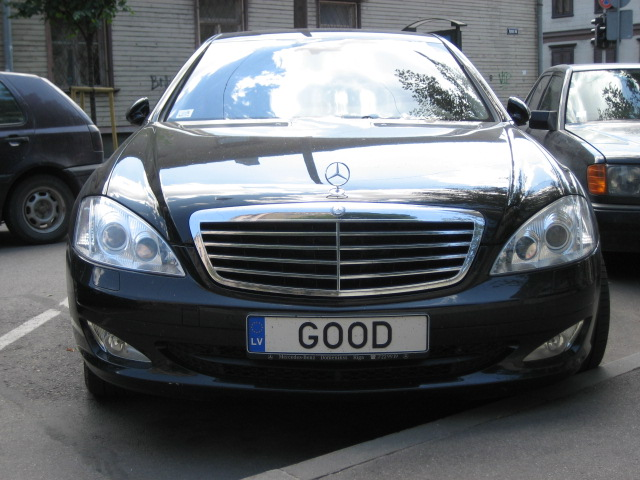
Latvian vanity plate.

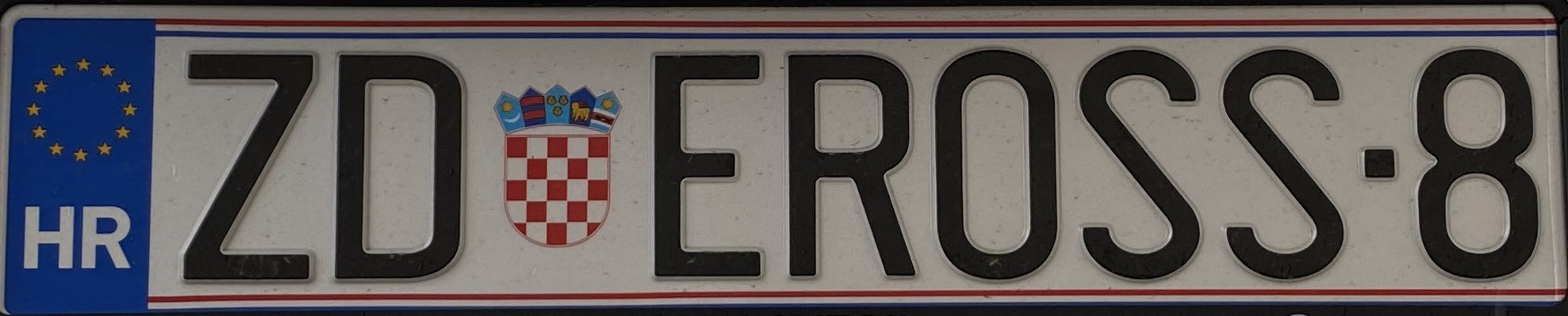
Croatian vanity plate

In Australia the various states offer personalised plate schemes, with some states having a yearly fee to maintain the cherished number. In the Australian states of Victoria and Queensland the proceeds from the sale of custom plates and personalised plates go towards road safety activities.

As of 2022, Austria, Andorra, Belgium, Cambodia, Croatia, Denmark, Eswatini, Finland, Hong Kong, Latvia, Luxembourg, Malta, Norway, Poland, Slovenia, Iceland, Sweden, and South Africa also allow such license plates. Additionally, Turkey allows for one to pay to add a blue section to their plate to display personalized text, however this isn't considered part of the plate number.

German car registration law does not allow license plates such as these, but it is possible to select the two letters after the district designation and up to four numbers thereafter for a small fee. It is common in Germany for car owners to register license plates with their initials and a year or number of significance to them. For example, a man by the name of Jonathan Walter living in Berlin and born in 1966 might opt to register B–JW 1966, providing it is still available, Japan and Brazil have a similar system. Combinations of letters that result in the names of organisations of the National Socialism such as SS, SA or HJ are banned in Germany.

On November 19, 2007, Dutch Member of Parliament Paul de Krom proposed that vanity plates be introduced in the Netherlands as well, after having seen them while visiting the United States. One barrier his proposal would have to overcome would be that the RDW (Netherlands Vehicle Authority) links license plates to the actual cars as opposed to their owners. Additionally, vowels are not allowed on Dutch license plates specifically because otherwise license plates could (unintentionally) spell a word, so allowing vanity plates would be a strange match with current law. On 25 January 2024, the PVV again proposed that vanity plates may be introduced in the country as well.

In Poland, there is an option to buy an individual number plate for an extra charge. The plate looks the same as an ordinary one, there is a letter showing the country district, then one number and then up to five letters of free choice.

In the United Arab Emirates, regular number plates consist of five digits and one optional character (depending on the emirate). So-called "distinguished plates" have a special combination of digits (12345, 55555, etc.) or less than five digits and are sold at public auctions, the profit of which is used for charities. Very low numbers fetch very high prices, the record being the number one plate from Abu Dhabi, sold for 52.2 million Dirhams (US$14 million). In Dubai, plate number one (without additional letter) is registered to the car of Sheikh Mohammed, ruler of Dubai.

On June 15, 2017, it became possible to apply for a personalized license plate in Norway. The person registering the plate must complete an online application and pay a fee of 9000 Norwegian kroner (about US$1058). If the license plate is considered appropriate and the application is approved by an employee, the applicant will have to pay the fee within a certain time limit. If the fee is not paid, the application is denied and the sign goes back into the pool and can be reserved by others. The service was reportedly so popular that the government's Public Roads website crashed within minutes of launch.

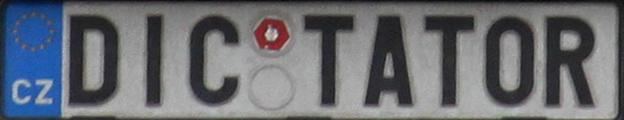
A Czech request plate; the O is actually a zero

The Czech Republic has allowed request plates since January 2016. While standard plates for automobiles, trucks, buses or trailers have 7 characters (grouped 3+4), request plates have 8 characters (3+5). For motorcycles, a standard plate has 6 characters (2+4), a request plate 7 characters (2+5). The whole string has to contain at least one digit. Plates must not contain vulgar or defamatory expressions, nor names of authority offices. As with the standard plates, they cannot contain the letters G, O, Q, or W. A single plate costs a CZK 5000 charge, the whole pair CZK 10000 charge, preliminary reservation CZK 500 up to 3 months. When the plate is lost or stolen, a duplicate cannot be emitted.

== See also ==
- Bumper Stumpers, a game show revolving around the vanity plate concept
- Vanity domain
