= Radegunda, Mozirje =

Radegunda Sveta Radegunda (until 1955)
- Location in Slovenia
- Coordinates: 46°21′24.54″N 14°55′54.9″E
- Country: Slovenia
- Traditional region: Styria
- Statistical region: Savinja
- Municipality: Mozirje

Area
  - Total: 10.04 km^{2} (3.88 sq mi)
- Elevation: 498.6 m (1,636 ft)

Population (2002)
  - Total: 287

Radegunda (pronounced [ɾadɛˈɡuːnda]) is a settlement in the Municipality of Mozirje in northern Slovenia. The area is part of the traditional region of Styria. The municipality is now included in the Savinja Statistical Region.

== Name ==
The name of the settlement was changed from Sveta Radegunda (literally, 'Saint Radegund') to Radegunda (literally, 'Radegund') in 1955. The name was changed on the basis of the 1948 Law on Names of Settlements and Designations of Squares, Streets, and Buildings as part of efforts by Slovenia's postwar communist government to remove religious elements from toponyms.

== Church ==
The local church, from which the settlement gets its name, is dedicated to Saint Radegund and belongs to the Parish of Šmihel nad Mozirjem. It was first mentioned in written documents dating to 1241. Much of the current building dates to a 1903 major rebuilding of the church.
