= Dobrovlje =

Dobrovlje may refer to:

- Dobrovlje, Braslovče, a village in Braslovče, central-eastern Slovenia
- Dobrovlje, Zreče, a village in Zreče, eastern Slovenia
- Dobrovlje pri Mozirju, a village in Mozirje, northeastern Slovenia
