= Christian Gostečnik =

Slovenian Roman Catholic priest

- Born: 1 May 1955; Šmihel nad Mozirjem, Slovenia
- Education: University of Ljubljana; Loyola University Chicago; Argosy University
- Known for: Relational family therapy
- Scientific career
- Fields: Psychologist
- Workplaces: Faculty of Theology, Ljubljana; Franciscan Family Institute

Christian Gostečnik, OFM (born 1 May 1955) is a Slovenian Roman Catholic priest. He is a member of the Franciscan Order of Friars Minor, and a theologian, clinical psychologist, and marriage-and-family therapist.

He was dean of the Faculty of Theology at the University of Ljubljana. He is a director of Franciscan Family Institute in Ljubljana (Slovene: Frančiškanski družinski inštitut; FDI).

== Biography ==
Gostečnik was born in Šmihel nad Mozirjem, Slovenia. After he entered the Franciscan order, he started studying at the Faculty of Theology in Ljubljana, where he graduated in 1983.

He was then sent to United States for further studies and also as a member of Slovenian-American Parish in Lemont, Illinois. During his stay in US he completed M.A. on Loyola University Chicago (1988), while at Illinois School of Professional Psychology (Argosy University) he completed specialization in Diagnostics (1991), specialization in marriage and family therapy (1993), internship in marriage and family therapy (1994) and PhD in clinical psychology (1995). Gostečnik was also instrumental in establishment of Slovenian Catholic Mission in Lemont in 1994.

In 1995 he returned to Ljubljana, Slovenia and became assistant professor (religious-educational psychology and medicine) at Faculty of Theology; in the same year he also established Franciscan Family Center (Slovene: Frančiškanski družinski center) (later renamed to current Franciscan Family Institute).

In two years, he finished his postdoctoral study and received doctorate of theology. He then completed his third PhD study, this time from psychology at Faculty of Arts, Ljubljana. In 2004 he was elected to associate professor and in 2009 to full professor.

During his academic career he "developed an innovative approach to marriage and family therapy called: Relational family therapy". In 2007 he was co-recipient of award for work on social services from Ministry of Work, Family and Social Affairs.

Between 2012 and 2016 he was dean of his alma mater: Faculty of Theology in Ljubljana.

== Bibliography ==
See CHRISTIAN GOSTEČNIK (18052): Personal bibliography for the period
