= Lepa Njiva =

- Location in Slovenia
- Coordinates: 46°22′41.02″N 14°58′39.14″E
- Country: Slovenia
- Traditional region: Styria
- Statistical region: Savinja
- Municipality: Mozirje

Area
  - Total: 11.65 km^{2} (4.50 sq mi)
- Elevation: 450.2 m (1,477 ft)

Population (2026)
  - Total: 468
- Postal code: 3330

Lepa Njiva (pronounced [ˈleːpa ˈnjiːʋa]) is a settlement in the Municipality of Mozirje in northern Slovenia. It lies in the hills north of Mozirje. The area is part of the traditional region of Styria. The municipality is now included in the Savinja Statistical Region.

The local church is dedicated to the Mother of God and belongs to the parish of Mozirje. It was first mentioned in written documents dating to 1493. Much of the current building dates to the 18th and 19th centuries. As of 1668, the church still lacked a tower and sacristy. It was vaulted in 1770, and the tower was raised in 1834.

Near Mlačnik in Lepa Njiva is the hill of Gradišče, where a castle is said to have stood, which held a fish pond belonging to a farmer named Jezerničnik. Remains of ancient pottery and wall paintings were found in Podstenšek's garden. Copper pipes were also found at the Jezerničnik farmstead.

The hamlet of Završe was first mentioned in 1241 as property of the Gornji Grad monastery.

== Population ==
In 1880, the village had 59 houses and 364 inhabitants, of whom 177 were women and 187 were men. All inhabitants were Catholic and Slovene-speaking, with no other religious or linguistic groups present.

In the following decades, the number of houses increased to 95 in 1890, 97 in 1900, and 103 in 1910. The population rose until 1900, from 519 in 1890 to 619, before declining slightly to 563 by 1910. The number of women and men followed a similar trend, with the proportions of each remaining roughly balanced.

The village saw significant growth in the number of houses and inhabitants in the late 19th and early 20th centuries, while maintaining religious and linguistic homogeneity, as all inhabitants were Catholic and Slovene-speaking.
