= Vehicle registration plates of Norway =

Kingdom of Norway
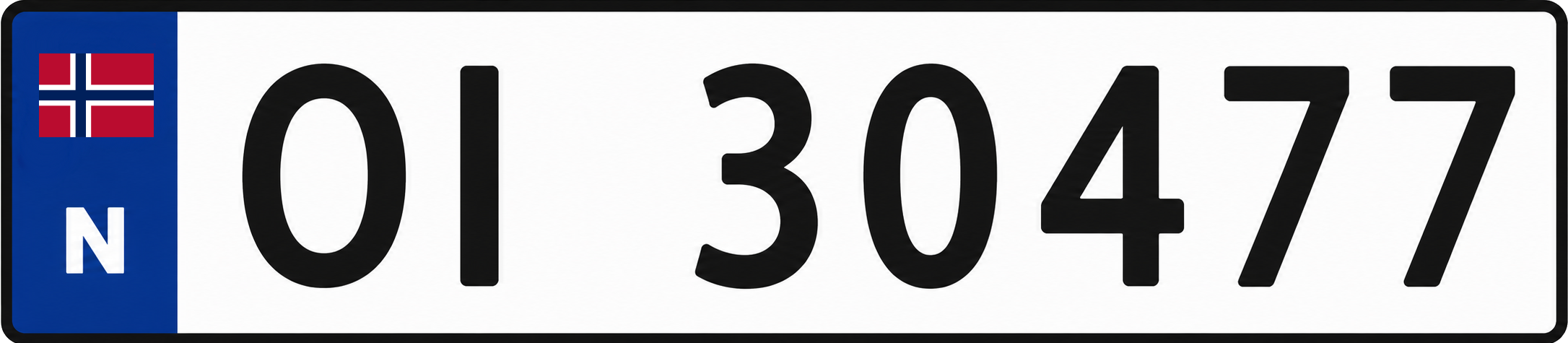
- Current regular legal standard number plate from Norway.
- Country: Norway
- Country code: N

Current series
- Size: 520 mm × 110 mm 20.5 in × 4.3 in
- Serial format: AB 12345 (for standard plates)
- Colour (front): Black on White
- Colour (rear): Black on White

Norwegian implementation of a format similar to the EU format. Both the EU format and the Norwegian format satisfy the Vienna Convention on Road Traffic.

The registration plates of cars in Norway are maintained by the Norwegian Ministry of Transport and Communications. As in most countries, cars are identified only by number plates read visually. Each plate is a legal document that both identifies the vehicle and permits its use, and shall be returned to the registration authority when the vehicle is no longer in use.

The current alphanumerical system (two letters followed by four or five numbers) was introduced in 1971. The design of the plates remained the same until 2002, when the road authorities decided on a new font which standardized the width of each character. The new design was unsuccessful due to legibility issues, for example the letters "A" and "R" were often hard to distinguish. From 2006 the font was changed again to improve legibility, and space was provided for a blue nationality stripe with a Norwegian flag. From 2009, plates were made of plastic, and produced in a factory at Tønsberg. From 2012, plates are again produced in aluminium due to the plastic plates easily getting damaged in winter.

== Licence plate design ==
The licence plates may have one of the following designs:

=== A – White reflective plate, black print ===
For cars, trucks, buses, etc. taxed and fit to drive on public roads. Most cars in Norway have these plates. Motorcycles, mopeds, moped cars, trailers, caravans etc have plates with two letters and four digits.

N
DP 70231

=== B – Black plate, yellow print ===
These are for all vehicles that are approved and deemed safe but never drive on public roads. This includes logging and mining equipment, snowmobiles, various transports at airports and ports, etc. Such vehicles are tax exempt. Vehicles registered on Svalbard also use these plates, as according to the Svalbard Treaty, national taxes may not be levied on Svalbard.

DJ 45765

=== C – Black plate, white print ===
Rally and other competition cars. The vehicle may be driven legally on the road to and from training and events if a NMF licence and a statement from the local club on training times is presented. Insurance and road tax has to be paid, but there is no import tax on new vehicles.

AA 12345

=== D – Orange plates, black print ===
Military cars, trucks, buses, tanks etc.

Orange plates with red print are military cars, such as tanks etc., see class I below

12345

=== E – Green reflective plate, black print ===
For cars, vans, small trucks, etc. taxed and fit to drive on public roads, equipped with only one row of seats (driver included) and with sufficient internal volume to fit a crate 140 cm long by 90 cm wide by 105 cm high. This category is primarily intended for tradesmen, couriers and such, but there is no restriction on who can own or operate such a vehicle. Vehicles with green plates are taxed more lightly than vehicles with white plates.

N
DA 12345

=== F – Blue plate, yellow print ===
These are diplomatic corps plates; they are used on official cars of foreign embassies and consular services. These plates always use prefix CD. The first two digits shows which diplomatic mission the vehicle belongs to. They are tax exempt.

CD 12345

CD 1234

=== G – Red plate, white print ===
Dealer plates. These plates are assigned to car dealerships and used for ferrying or test driving. They can be moved freely from car to car.

DA 12

Since mid 2015 there is a new format starting from AAA10. This format is centrally issued.

ABC 12

Dealer plates for trailers has a T as suffix.

DA 12T

ABC 12T

=== H – Red plate, black print ===
Stickers used for ferrying or testing unregistered but roadworthy vehicles, prototypes etc. Issued on day-to-day basis at a cost of NOK 310 per day. The date of issue is printed to the right of the registration number.

DA123

=== I – Orange plate, red print ===
Military test plates, with two or three letters (FMU or T-U) followed by three number with leading zero. FMU is for "Forsvarsmuséet" (the Armed Forces Museum) or T-U for "Test og utvikling" (testing and development).

T-U 001

FMU 001

=== J – White plates, black print, red margins ===
Export and tourist plates. No letters. Left and right is a red border with the month/year of expiry written vertically.

00	12345	00

=== Personalised number plates ===
Starting in 2017, it is possible to apply for personalised number plates bearing any combination of two to seven letters and digits, with certain exceptions, mainly for offensive words or phrases and registered trademarks. Subject to those conditions, and upon payment of a NOK 9 000 fee, the applicant is granted the exclusive right to use the requested registration number on any class A or E vehicle they own for ten years.

N
PERSONA

N
PS

== Validation sticker ==

Between 1993 and 2012, self-adhesive validation stickers in primary colours were issued annually to every car that had valid road tax and insurance and had passed its latest biennial safety and emissions test. The stickers included the registration number in the form of a bar code, and changed colour every year on a three-year cycle: red, blue and yellow.

The use of validation stickers was discontinued from May 2012. The police will now rely on automated systems which photograph the number plate, identify the registration number using optical character recognition, and check the car's status in a database.

== Nationality stripe ==
A licence plate from Hafslund

Norwegian plates manufactured after 1 November 2006 have a nationality stripe on the left end of the plates. This stripe is blue with Norway's national flag and international vehicle registration code "N", in a similar format to that used by many central European countries before they became EU members. The resemblance to EU registration plates infuriated some adherents of the anti-EU movement, leading the Public Roads Administration to issue white or black adhesive labels with which they could cover the blue stripe.

== Manufacture of licence plates ==
The manufacture of licence plates is strictly controlled by the authorities. Plates are provided when a registration application is accepted. If plates are stolen, new ones will not be issued until a police enquiry is complete. Plates of all types, except some F-type plates, were previously produced in aluminium. Between 1 January 2009 and 31 December 2011, plates were made of plastic, which made them slightly thicker than the older aluminium ones (requiring thicker plate holders). These plates were much less expensive. They had a transparent plastic layer on top of the layer with the writing, which was especially prone to breaking on impact during cold weather (such as being hit by another car's trailer hitch). This, in addition to the higher recycling costs of plastic compared to aluminium led to the cessation of plastic plates in favour of aluminium ones as of 1 January 2012, although with the same price as the plastic plates.

== Prefixes and sequence numbers ==
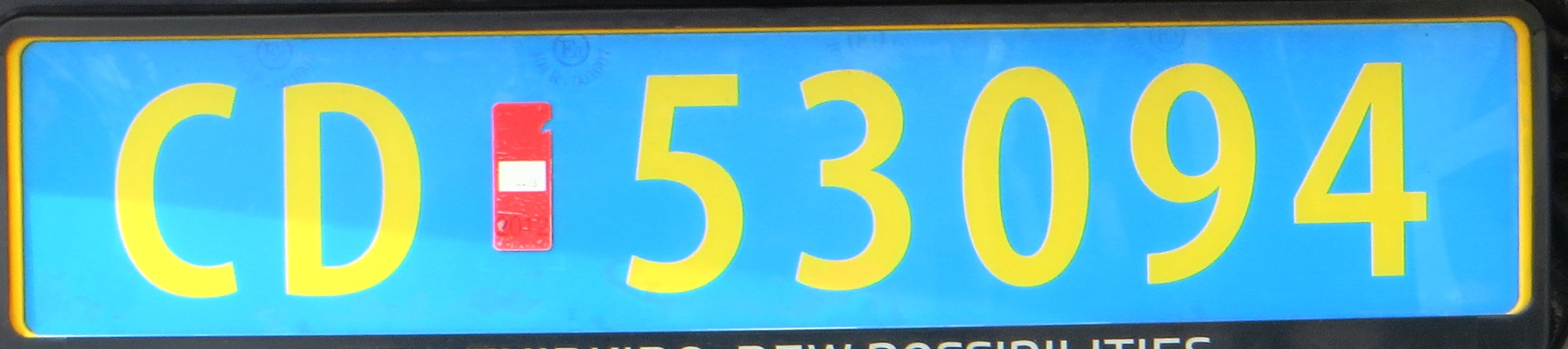
Corps Diplomatique plate

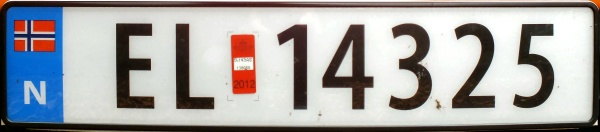
The Norwegian license plates of all-electric vehicles have a prefix "EL", "EK", "EV", "EB", "EC", "ED", "EE", "EF", "EH", "EJ", "EN", "EP" or "ER" to enforce the privileges zero emission vehicles are entitled to.

All Norwegian licence plates for civilian vehicles have a prefix of two letters, followed by a sequence of numbers. Military licence plates have numbers only. Most vehicles have five-digit registration numbers between 10000 and 99999. Motorcycles, farming equipment and trailers have four-digit registration numbers between 1000 and 9999 is used. Temporary plates have three-digit registration numbers between 100 and 999. Dealer plates have two-digit registration numbers between 10 and 99.

Special prefixes are:

- CD: Corps Diplomatique
- EL, EK, EV, EB, EC, ED, EE, EF, EH, EJ, EN, EP, ER, EA and EU: Electrically powered vehicles (not hybrids)
- FE: Former military vehicles (of vintage 2005 or later) sold or transferred to civilian use
- GA: autogas/LPG (liquified petroleum gas) or other gas powered vehicles
- HY: Hydrogen powered vehicles

Ordinary vehicle plates have a prefix based on the geographic location for the first registration, and will be unchanged later.

Area	County	Registration series
Halden	Østfold	AA AB AC
Hafslund	Østfold	AD AR AS AT AU AV AW DW FL ES
Moss	Østfold	AX AY AZ BA
Mysen	Østfold	AJ AK AL AN AP FN BW
Sarpsborg	Østfold	AE AF AH
Asker and Bærum	Akershus	BL BN BP BR BS BT BU BV BX BY BZ CA CB
Drøbak	Akershus	BC BD BE BF BH BJ BK
Jessheim	Akershus	CV CX CY CZ CU
Lillestrøm	Akershus	CC CE CF CH CJ CK CL CN CP CR CS CT CU
Drammen	Buskerud	KE KF KH KJ KK KL KN KP KR KS
Gol	Buskerud	KB KC KD
Hønefoss	Buskerud	JU JV JX JY JZ KA
Kongsberg	Buskerud	KT KU KV KX KY
Oslo	Oslo	DA DB DC DD DE DF DH DJ DK DL DN DP DR DS DT DU DV DX DY DZ (4-digits only: EA EU EF EH EJ EN EP ER)
Elverum	Innlandet	HB HC HD HE HA FZ
Fagernes	Innlandet	JR JS JT
Gjøvik	Innlandet	JC JD JE JF JH JJ JK JL JN JP
Hamar	Innlandet	FS FT FU FV FX FY FZ FW ET
Kongsvinger	Innlandet	HJ HK HL HN HP HR
Lillehammer	Innlandet	HS HT HU HV HX FB
Otta	Innlandet	HZ JA JB
Tynset	Innlandet	HF HH
Horten	Vestfold	KZ LA LB LC LD
Larvik	Vestfold	LS LT LU LV LX LZ NA NB NC
Sandefjord	Vestfold	LY NA
Tønsberg	Vestfold	LH LJ LK LL LN LP LR LD
Notodden	Telemark	NV NX NY NZ
Rjukan	Telemark	PA PB
Skien	Telemark	ND NE NF NH NJ NK NL NN NP NR NT NU
Arendal	Agder	PC PD PE PF PH PJ PK
Flekkefjord	Agder	RA RB
Kristiansand	Agder	PN PP PR PS PT PU PV PW
Mandal	Agder	PX PY PZ RC RD
Setesdal	Agder	PL LF
Egersund	Rogaland	RZ SA SB
Haugesund	Rogaland	SC SD SE SF SH SJ SK SL
Stavanger	Rogaland	RE RF RH RJ RK RL RN RP RR RS RT RU RV RX RY RW
Bergen	Vestland	SN SP SR SS ST SU SV SX SY SZ TA TB TC TD TE HW
Førde	Vestland	TV TX TY TZ
Nordfjordeid	Vestland	UA UB
Odda	Vestland	TS TT TU
Sogndalsfjøra	Vestland	UC UD
Stord	Vestland	TL TN TP TR
Voss	Vestland	TF TH TJ TK
Kristiansund	Møre og Romsdal	UX UY UZ VA
Molde	Møre og Romsdal	UR US UT UU UV
Sunndalsøra	Møre og Romsdal	VB VC
Ørsta	Møre og Romsdal	UN UP BB
Ålesund	Møre og Romsdal	UE UF UH UJ UK UL
Brekstad	Trøndelag	XA XB XC
Levanger	Trøndelag	XK XL VW
Namsos	Trøndelag	XR XS XT XU
Orkdalen	Trøndelag	VX VY VZ
Steinkjer	Trøndelag	XD XE XF XH XJ XW
Stjørdal	Trøndelag	XN XP YW
Støren	Trøndelag	VS VT
Trondheim	Trøndelag	FP VD VE VF VH VJ VK VL VN VP VR VS VU VV NW
Bodø	Nordland	YE YF YH YJ FD EZ
Fauske	Nordland	YK YL
Mo i Rana	Nordland	YA YB YC YD
Mosjøen	Nordland	XV XX XY XZ FA
Narvik	Nordland	YN YP YR YS
Sortland	Nordland	YU YV YX
Svolvær	Nordland	YT YY
Finnsnes	Troms	ZD ZF ZJ EX
Harstad	Troms	YZ ZA ZB TW
Storslett	Troms	FK SW
Tromsø	Troms	ZC ZE ZH ZK ZL FC
Alta	Finnmark	ZT ZU ZV ZY ZW UW
Hammerfest	Finnmark	ZX FF EX
Kirkenes	Finnmark	ZS EY
Lakselv	Finnmark	ZZ CW
Vadsø	Finnmark	FR ZP ZR LE
Longyearbyen	Svalbard	ZN FH

The letters G, I, O and Q are not used due to their similarity with other letters or numbers; an exception is that CNG vehicles such as gas buses use "GA". M and W were originally not used as they are much wider than other letters, but some codes including W are now assigned. The Norwegian letters Æ, Ø, and Å are not used either. Additionally, the combinations "NS" and "SS" have been omitted because of their connotations to World War II. (Although SS is in use on four-digit plates used for motorcycles, tractors and trailers etc.)

When a vehicle is scrapped or exported, the registration number/chassis is tagged as such, and the vehicle is no longer allowed to travel by road. Neither can the registration number be reused. Example; BL50000 will always be the real-life version of the legendary "Il Tempo Gigante" from the Flåklypa Grand Prix movie.

Single-letter plates are reused when vacant, but only available for vintage vehicles from 1971 or earlier.

If a set of licence plates is stolen, the vehicle will be re-registered on different plates.

=== Diplomatic Corps codes ===
The diplomatic fleet is identified by a code built up by CD <nn><abc> where <nn> is the country identifier as described below and <abc> is a sequence number.

Code	Country or Organization
10	United States
11	Argentina
12	Afghanistan
14	Belgium
15	Brazil
16	United Kingdom
17	Bulgaria
18	Philippines
19	International Barents Secretariat
20	Canada
21	Chile
22	Colombia
23	Cuba
24	Costa Rica
25	Algeria
26	Denmark
27	South Sudan
28	European Union
29	Egypt
30	Ecuador (previously Burundi)
31	Estonia
32	Georgia
33	Finland
34	France
35	United Nations Development Programme
36	United Arab Emirates
37	Greece
38	Ghana
39	International Organization for Migration
40	India
41	Indonesia
42	Iran
43	Iceland
44	Israel
45	Italy
46	Iraq
47	Saudi Arabia
48	Japan
49	Serbia
50	Jordan
51	Kazakhstan
52	China
53	South Korea
54	North Korea (obsolete)
55	Croatia
56	Morocco
57	Mexico
58	Myanmar
59	Kosovo
60	Netherlands
61	El Salvador
62	Pakistan
63	Panama (obsolete)
64	Poland
65	Portugal
66	Palestine
67	Peru
68	Romania
69	Kuwait
70	Angola
71	Russia
72	Spain
73	Switzerland
74	Sweden
75	South Africa
76	Thailand
77	Czech Republic
78	Turkey
79	East Germany (obsolete)
80	Germany
81	Tunisia
82	Ukraine
83	Hungary
84	Qatar
86	Venezuela (obsolete)
87	Vietnam
88	North Macedonia
89	Austria
90	Slovakia
91	Lithuania
92	Guatemala (obsolete)
93	Bosnia and Herzegovina
94	Latvia
95	Sudan
96	Sri Lanka
97	Ireland

== Other issues ==
Norway does not have any particular numbering scheme or plate kind to indicate vehicle usage such as police, taxi, ambulance or others, except for type F plates used by foreign diplomats.

The numbers for all plates except type D have a code consisting of two letters and a serial number. Class D only carries a sequence number. The letters identify the district in which the vehicle was first registered. For example, in Stavanger, prefixes like RE, RH and RJ are used. The car registration number is not altered when the owner moves to another town, or if it is sold.

The registration number is assigned to a vehicle's chassis number (often etched into the wall, or on a plaque inside the engine room (older cars), or on a small plate in the lower corner of the windscreen (newer cars)) when it is first imported to Norway. Example; A Toyota Corolla from 1972 imported and first-time registered in Oslo would have the letters DA assigned to its chassis number (KE20-XXXXX) + the five numbers that makes the car unique. Also, registration numbers are usually assigned to groups of cars imported into Norway. Another example; If a car dealer imports 16 cars to Hamar in one shipment, the entire shipment would, as an example, be registered as FS10000, FS10001, and so on, up to FS10015. A way of seeing how old a car is from its registration number is noticing the car's age and compare it to the registration number, as a 1970–1973 model car registered in Oslo will have the DA-prefix. This is not always the cause, as it depends on when the car is imported into Norway. Oslo began in 1971 with "DA", and proceeded to "DB" around 1974, to DC in 1977, DD around 1980, DE around 1984, DF around 1987, DH in 1992, DJ around 1997, DK around 2000, DL around 2006, DN around 2008, and DP around 2010. A car may also have been assigned a new registration number after its former one has been reported stolen or lost.

The city of Bergen has previously used the SV-series. However, SV is also used as the short form for "Sosialistisk Venstreparti," (Socialist Left Party) a political party. This caused some people from Bergen to register their cars elsewhere.

== History ==
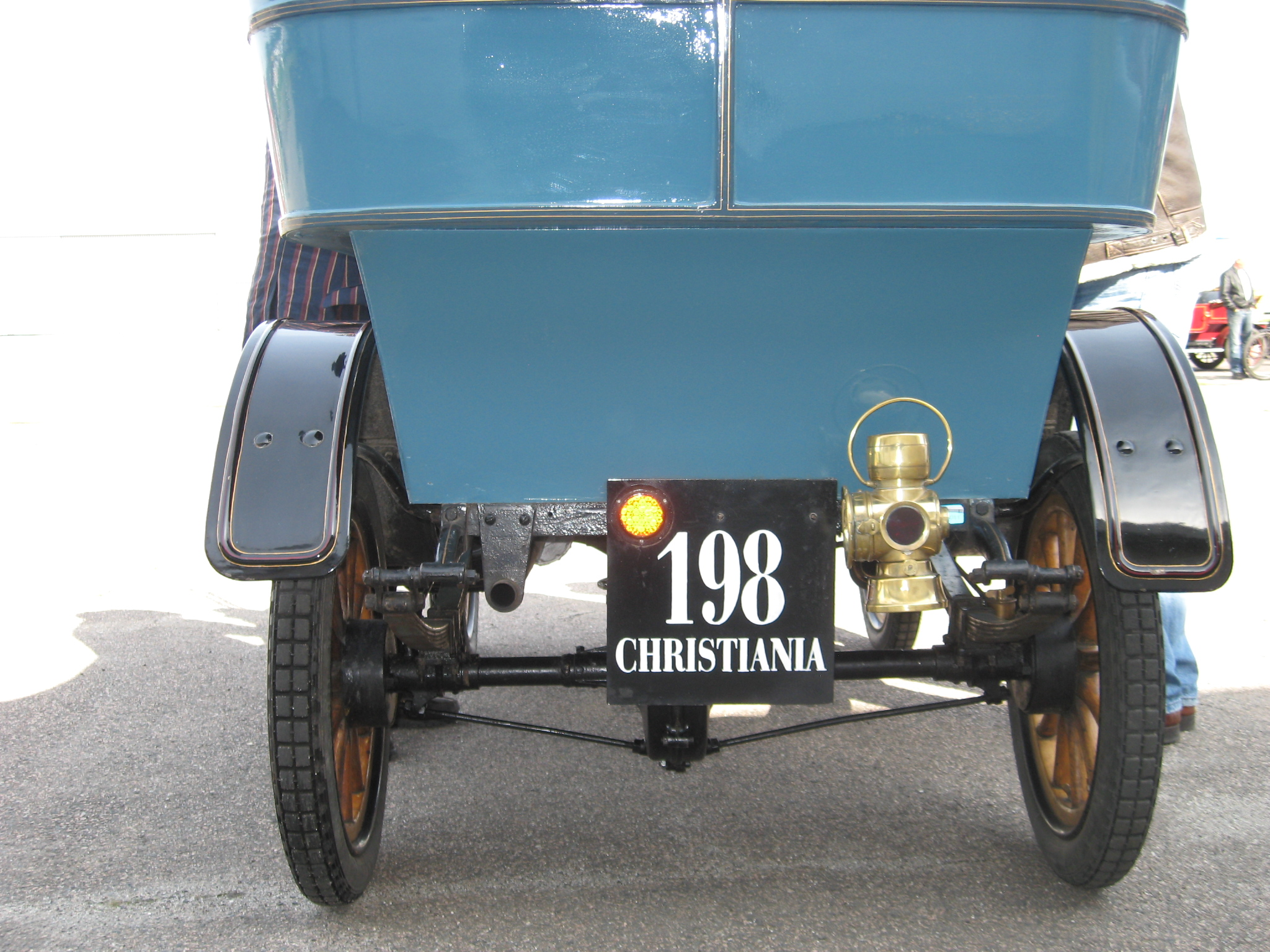
License plate from 1900–1913: later reproduction

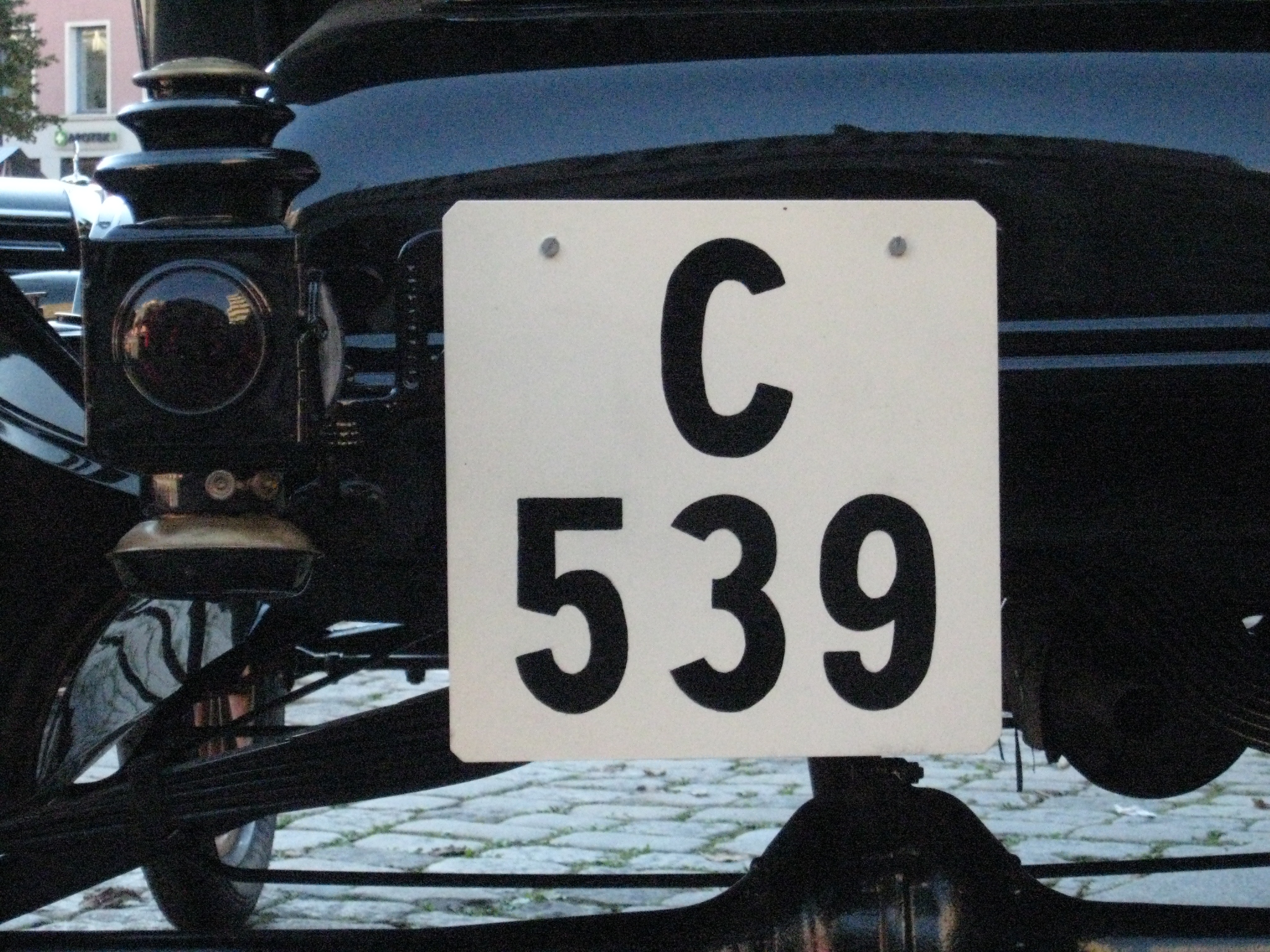
License plate from 1913–1929: later reproduction

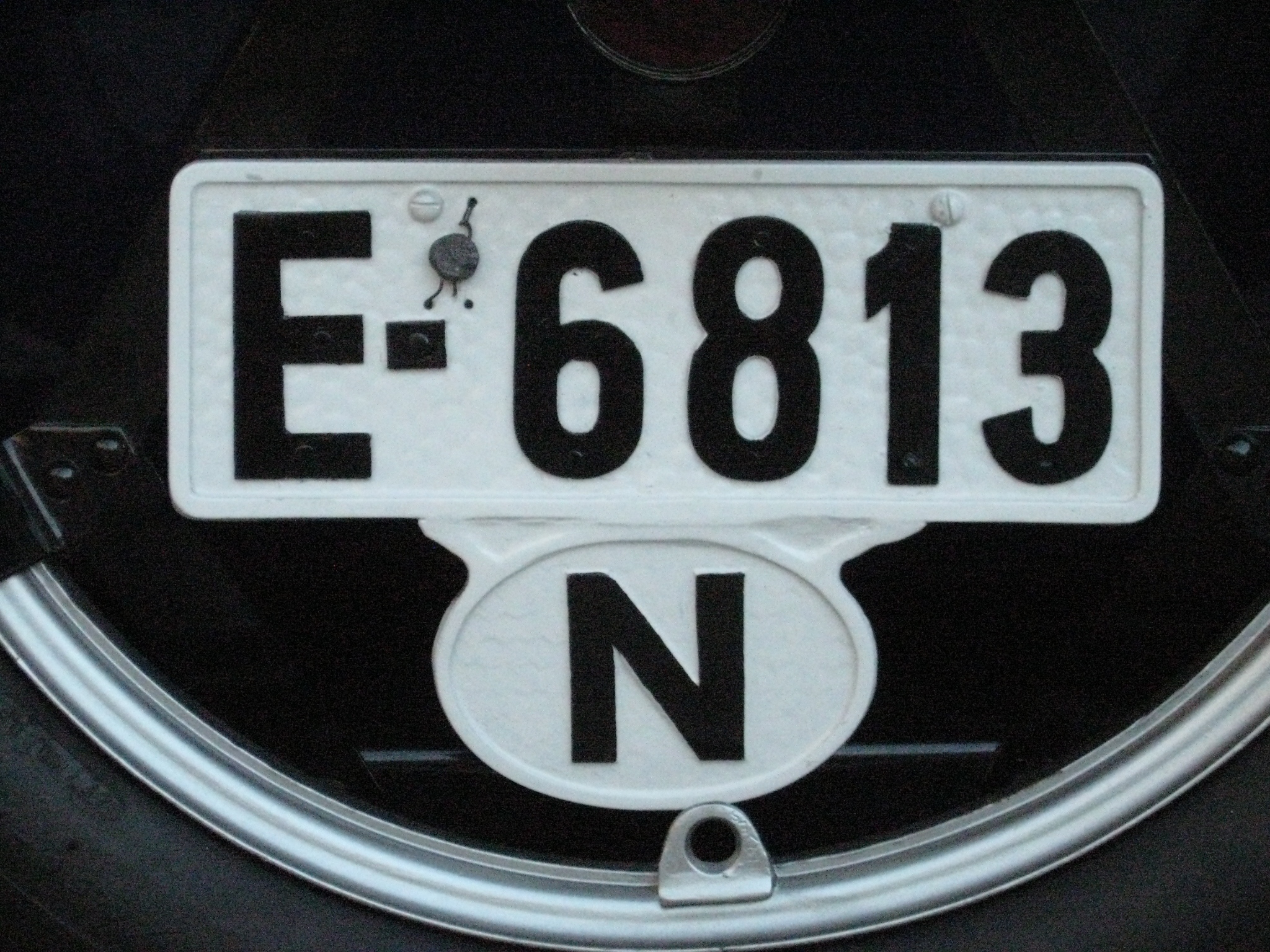
License plate from 1929–1971: later reproduction

From 1 April 1900 to 31 March 1913 regional license plates with only digits were in use. The license plates were in black with digits and the name of the province/town in white. Surviving vehicles from the period may use the original license plates. Only a handful of such vehicles exist today.

From 1 April 1913 to 31 March 1971 only a single letter was used on Norwegian vehicle license plates. From 1958 an additional series with 6 digits in 3 groups was in use in Oslo. Vehicles older than 1971 (import or Norwegian) may use single-letter plates of the current owners choice, although within existing letter codes and 3–6 digits, or 6 digits without letter. Once chosen, the license plates follow the vehicle. Common practice is to use the earliest known or available single-letter plates on which the car was registered.

=== Registration letter codes 1913–1971 ===
County (name before / after 1918):

- no letter: Kristiania amt / Oslo
- A: Kristiania amt / Oslo
- B: Smaalenenes amt / Østfold
- C: Akershus amt / Akershus
- D: Hedemarkens amt / Hedmark
- E: Kristians amt / Oppland
- F: Buskeruds amt / Buskerud
- G: Jarlsberg og Larviks amt / Vestfold until 1929: G
- Z: Vestfold from 1929
- H: Bratsberg amt / Telemark
- I: Nedenes amt / Aust-Agder
- K: Lister og Mandals amt / Vest-Agder
- L: Stavanger amt / Rogaland
- O: Bergen amt / Bergen
- R: Søndre Bergenhus amt / Hordaland
- S: Nordre Bergenhus amt / Sogn og Fjordane
- T: Romsdals amt / Møre og Romsdal
- U: Søndre Trondhjems amt / Sør-Trøndelag
- V: Nordre Trondhjems amt / Nord-Trøndelag
- W: Nordlands amt / Nordland
- X: Tromsø amt / Troms
- Y: Finmarken amt / Finnmark

== See also ==
- List of international vehicle registration codes
- Vehicle registration plates of Europe
