= Ljubija, Mozirje =

Ljubija
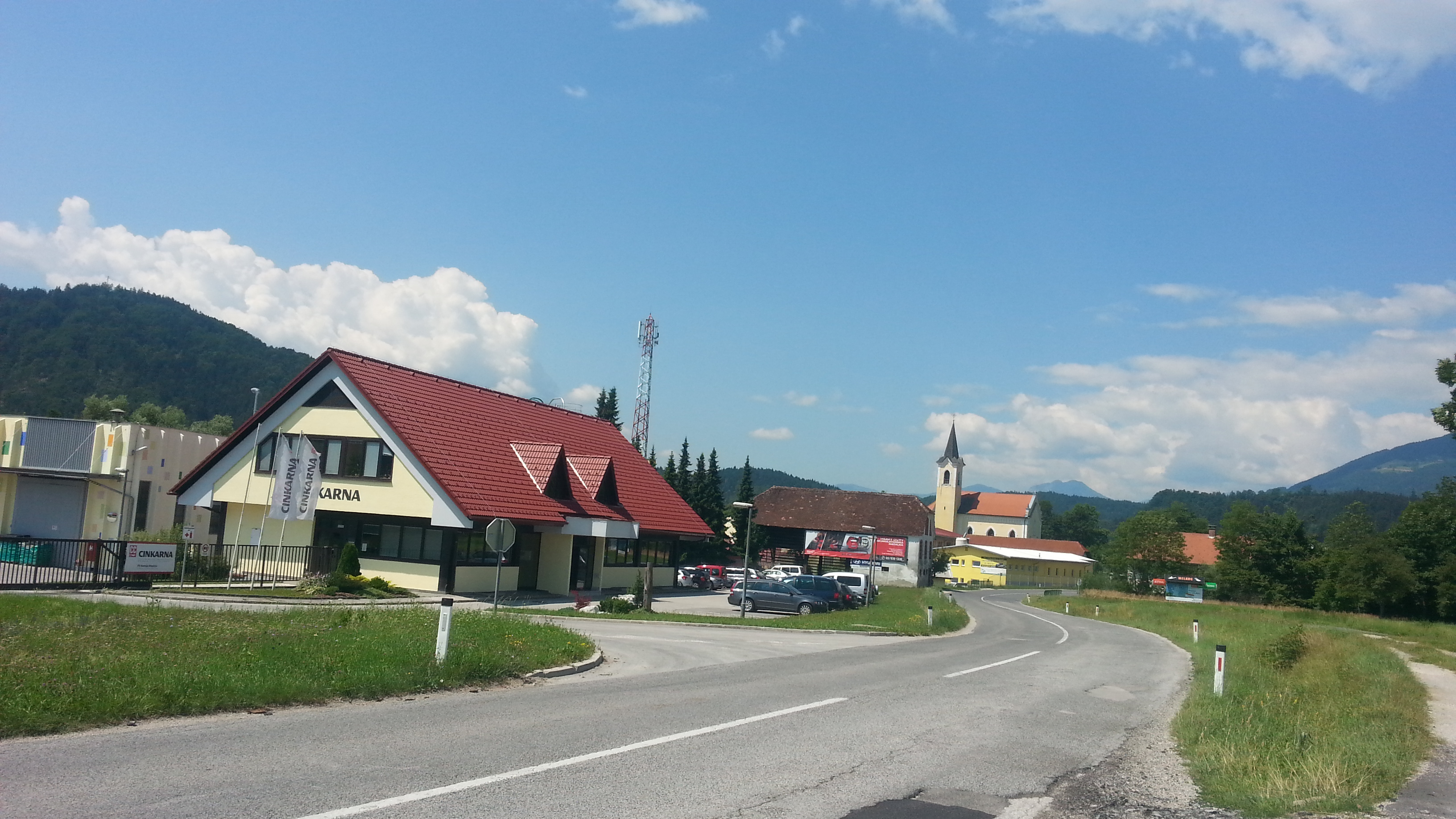

- Location in Slovenia
- Coordinates: 46°20′30.51″N 14°58′22.28″E
- Country: Slovenia
- Traditional region: Styria
- Statistical region: Savinja
- Municipality: Mozirje

Area
  - Total: 4.3 km^{2} (1.7 sq mi)
- Elevation: 340.2 m (1,116 ft)

Population (2002)
  - Total: 482

Ljubija (pronounced [ljuˈbiːja]) is a settlement in the Municipality of Mozirje in northern Slovenia. It lies on the left bank of the Savinja River east of Mozirje itself. The area is part of the traditional region of Styria. The municipality is now included in the Savinja Statistical Region.

The local church is dedicated to Saint Nicholas and belongs to the parish of Mozirje. It was first mentioned in written documents dating to 1241. It was extended in 1582 and again in the 19th century.
