= Brezje, Mozirje =

Brezje
- Location in Slovenia
- Coordinates: 46°21′13.91″N 14°58′17.58″E
- Country: Slovenia
- Traditional region: Styria
- Statistical region: Savinja
- Municipality: Mozirje

Area
  - Total: 5.6 km^{2} (2.2 sq mi)
- Elevation: 379 m (1,243 ft)

Population (2002)
  - Total: 230

Brezje (pronounced [ˈbɾeːzjɛ]) is a settlement in the Municipality of Mozirje in northern Slovenia. It lies in the hills above the left bank of the Savinja River north of Mozirje itself. The area is part of the traditional region of Styria. The municipality is now included in the Savinja Statistical Region.

Archaeological evidence at a site in the southern part of the settlement points to prehistoric settlement in the area.
