= Municipality of Mozirje =

Municipality of Slovenia

Municipality of Mozirje Občina Mozirje
- Municipality
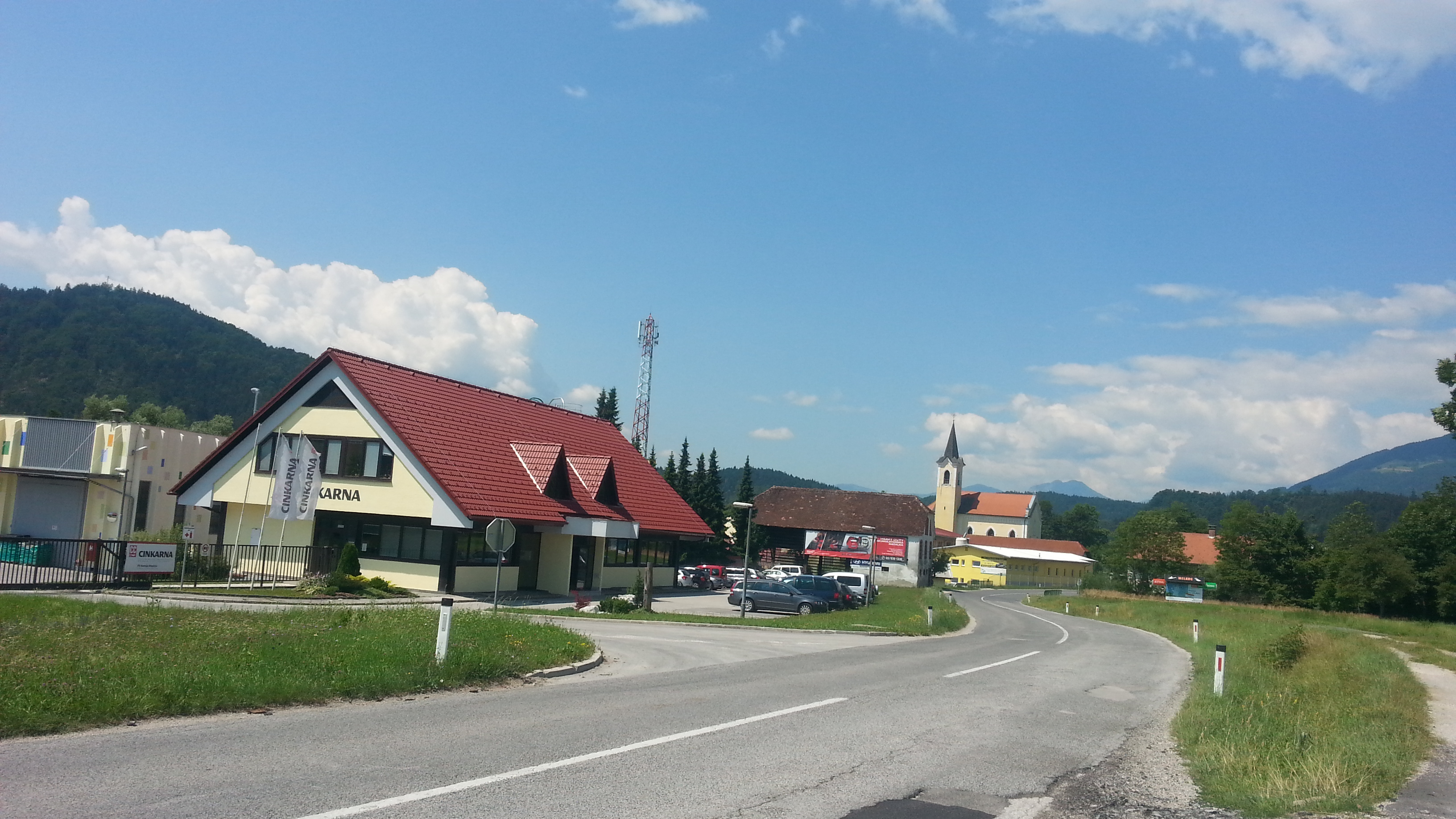

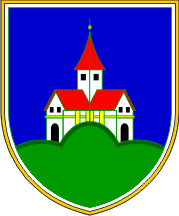
- Coat of arms

- Location of the Municipality of Mozirje in Slovenia
- Coordinates: 46°22′N 14°58′E
- Country: Slovenia

Government
  - Mayor: Ivan Suhoveršnik (Independent)

Area
  - Total: 53.5 km^{2} (20.7 sq mi)

Population (2016)
  - Total: 4,062
  - Density: 75.9/km^{2} (197/sq mi)
- Time zone: UTC+01 (CET)
  - Summer (DST): UTC+02 (CEST)
- Website: www.mozirje.si

The Municipality of Mozirje (pronounced [mɔˈziːɾjɛ]; Slovene: Občina Mozirje) is a municipality in the traditional region of Styria in northeastern Slovenia. The seat of the municipality is the town of Mozirje. Mozirje became a municipality in 1994.

== Settlements ==
In addition to the municipal seat of Mozirje, the municipality also includes the following settlements:

- Brezje
- Dobrovlje pri Mozirju
- Lepa Njiva
- Ljubija
- Loke pri Mozirju
- Radegunda
- Šmihel nad Mozirjem
