= Vehicle registration plates of Slovenia =

Republic of Slovenia
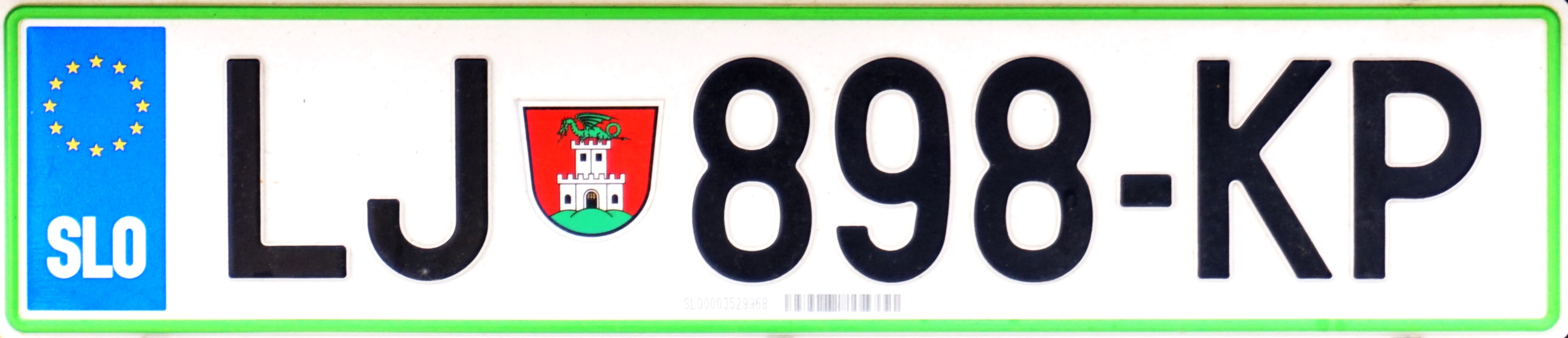
- Slovenian registration plates from June 2008
- Country: Slovenia
- Country code: SLO

Current series
- Size: 520 mm × 120 mm 20.5 in × 4.7 in
- Colour (front): Black on white
- Colour (rear): Black on white

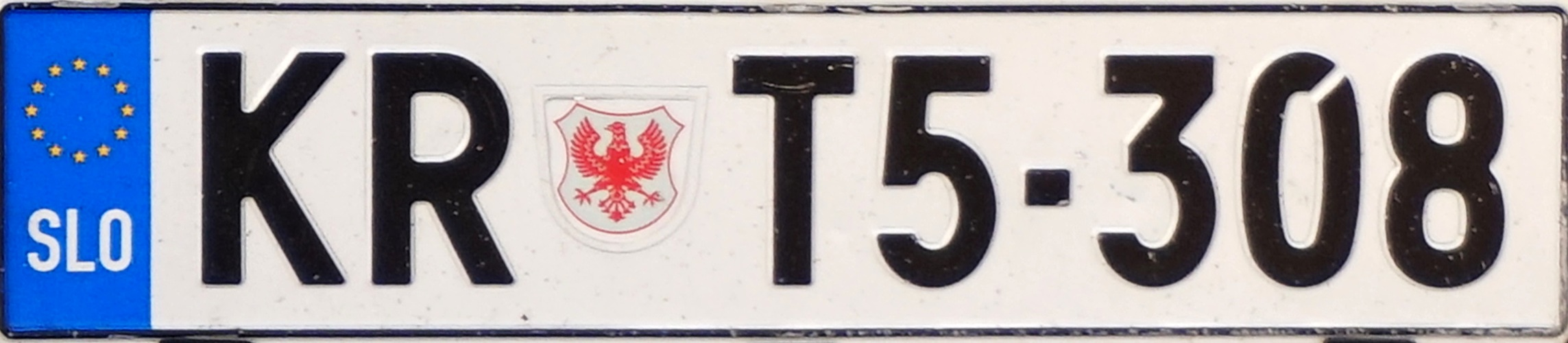
A 2004–2008 series plate

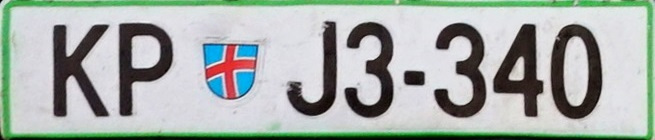
Old car plates 1992–2004 (the same plate is used again since 2008 but with the EU band at left)

Slovenian car number plates are vehicle registration plates found on Slovenian cars. The code for Slovenia itself is SLO. The registration plates are made of metal. On the left there is a blue bar as in other EU countries (in use since 2004) along with tamper-proof text up to 2008; the text is in black letters on a white background in Helvetica typeface. In 2008 the plates reverted to a green border used before 2004 and the old font but retaining the EU border at the left. Two plates must be present on each car - one at the front and one at the rear. In the case of motorcycles, only one plate is needed on the back of the vehicle. These plates can have different sizes, being the regional code in the first line, at the top.

== Location prefixes and regional divisions ==
On regular issue license plates, the first 2 letters before the shield sticker denote the region where the car was initially registered. Further division is made by the coat of arms of the corresponding city, placed after the regional area letters to denote subdivisions.

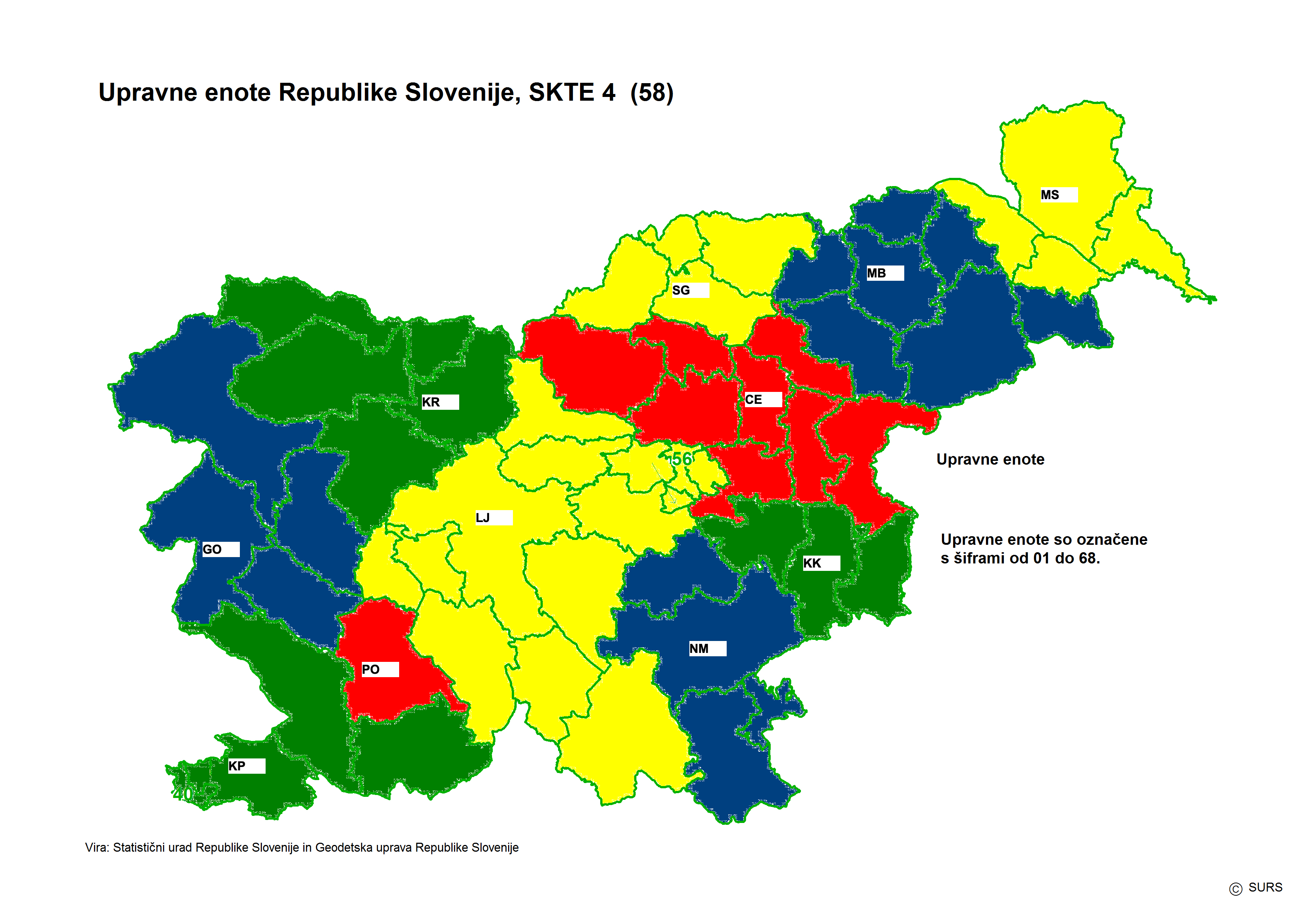
Map of Slovene area codes

Code	Region	Subdivisions
CE	Celje	Celje
CE	Celje	Laško
CE	Celje	Mozirje
CE	Celje	Slovenske Konjice
CE	Celje	Šentjur
CE	Celje	Šmarje pri Jelšah
CE	Celje	Velenje
CE	Celje	Žalec
GO	Nova Gorica	Ajdovščina
GO	Nova Gorica	Idrija
GO	Nova Gorica	Tolmin
GO	Nova Gorica	Nova Gorica
KK	Krško	Brežice
KK	Krško	Krško
KK	Krško	Sevnica
KP	Koper	Izola
KP	Koper	Koper
KP	Koper	Piran
KP	Koper	Sežana
KP	Koper	Ilirska Bistrica
KR	Kranj	Jesenice
KR	Kranj	Kranj
KR	Kranj	Radovljica
KR	Kranj	Škofja Loka
KR	Kranj	Tržič
LJ	Ljubljana	Cerknica
LJ	Ljubljana	Domžale
LJ	Ljubljana	Grosuplje
LJ	Ljubljana	Hrastnik
LJ	Ljubljana	Kamnik
LJ	Ljubljana	Kočevje
LJ	Ljubljana	Litija
LJ	Ljubljana	Ljubljana
LJ	Ljubljana	Logatec
LJ	Ljubljana	Ribnica
LJ	Ljubljana	Trbovlje
LJ	Ljubljana	Vrhnika
LJ	Ljubljana	Zagorje ob Savi
MB	Maribor	Lenart v Slovenskih Goricah
MB	Maribor	Maribor
MB	Maribor	Ormož
MB	Maribor	Pesnica pri Mariboru
MB	Maribor	Ptuj
MB	Maribor	Ruše
MB	Maribor	Slovenska Bistrica
MS	Murska Sobota	Gornja Radgona
MS	Murska Sobota	Lendava
MS	Murska Sobota	Ljutomer
MS	Murska Sobota	Murska Sobota
NM	Novo Mesto	Črnomelj
NM	Novo Mesto	Metlika
NM	Novo Mesto	Novo Mesto
NM	Novo Mesto	Trebnje
PO	Postojna	Postojna
SG	Slovenj Gradec	Dravograd
SG	Slovenj Gradec	Radlje ob Dravi
SG	Slovenj Gradec	Ravne na Koroškem
SG	Slovenj Gradec	Slovenj Gradec

== Special plates ==
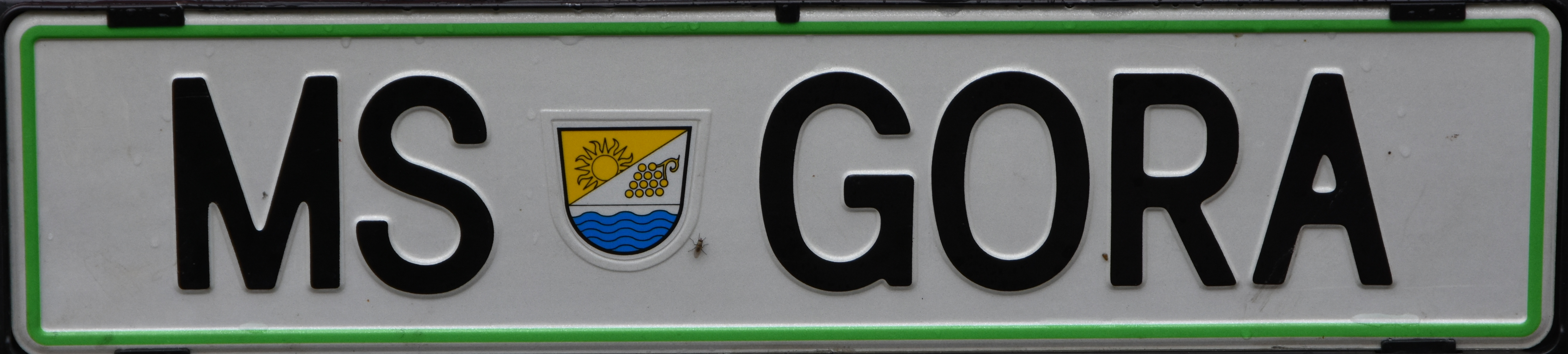
Slovenian vanity registration plate

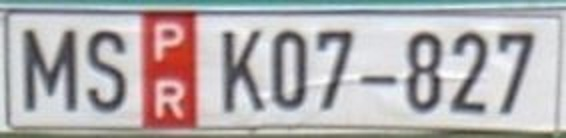
Slovenian temporary registration plate

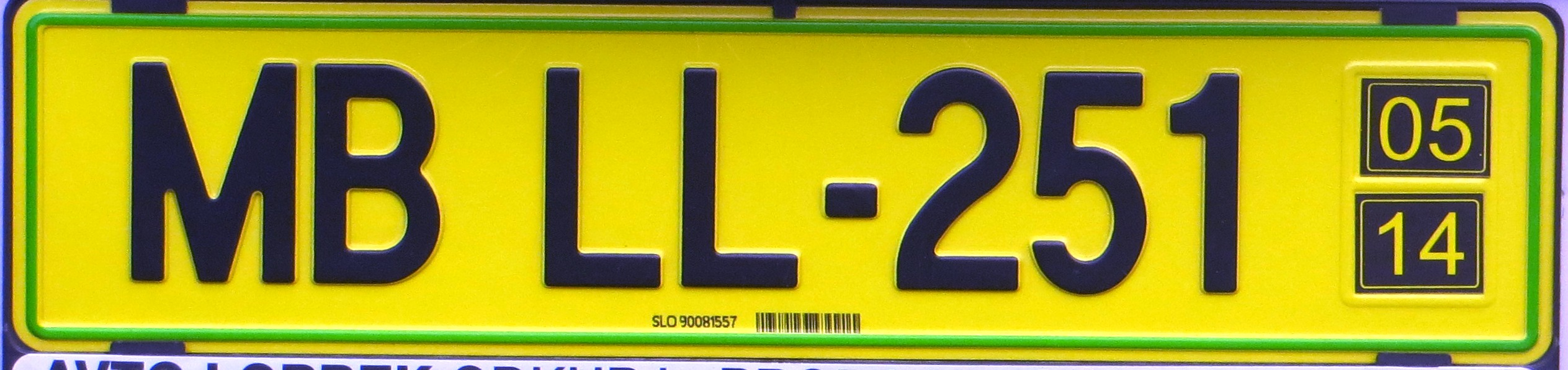
Slovenian export registration plate

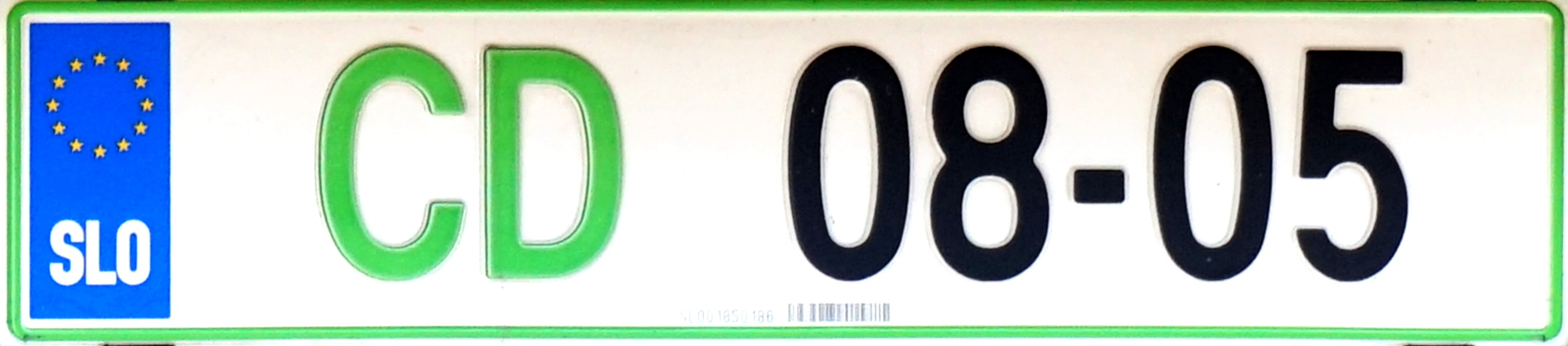
Slovenian diplomatic plate

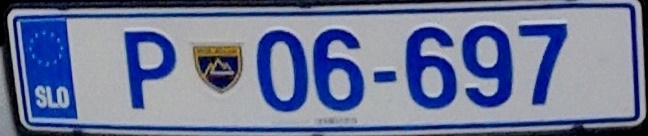
Slovenian police registration plate

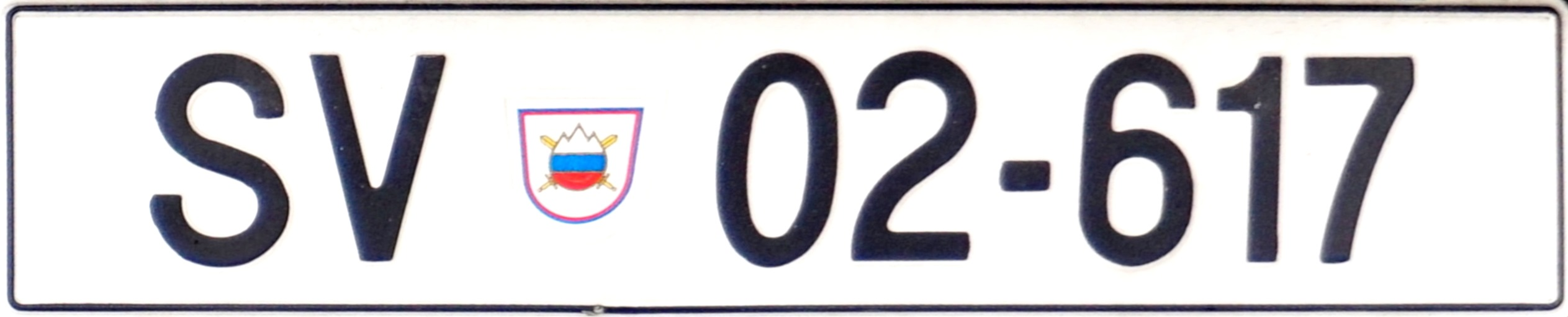
Slovenian army registration plate

- Diplomatic plates on official diplomatic cars are prefixed CMD and CD. Other cars of international and diplomatic missions start are prefixed M. All have four digits after the letters. The first two numbers identify the organization or embassy. Since early 2001 all have the letter in green and then numbers in black on a white background.
- Military plates consist of white letters on a black background or opposite and start with "SV".
- Police plates are blue on a white background and start with "P".
- Temporary plates for long periods are black on white with a euroband (since 2004), the region code and crest followed by one letter, one numeral, a hyphen, one numeral and one letter. The last two digits of the year are vertically aligned on the right. Motorcycle plates have the euroband, code and crest above three numerals and the two digits for the year.
- Temporary test plates previously contained "E" in the serial and had a green background. Current temporary plate are white with a red band with the region code, letters "PR" vertically on a red band, one letter, two numerals, a hyphen and three numerals. Metal plates for dealers have the region code and crest followed by one letter and two numerals.
- Export plates are black on a yellow background with the month and year of validity in little black panels to the right.
- Moped plates are same as export plates, except in a reduced size.
- Agricultural plates are white on a green background.
- Trailer plates had the reverse format of the regular issue plates i.e. the region code is after the shield and the serial number before.
