= Vehicle registration plates of Eswatini =

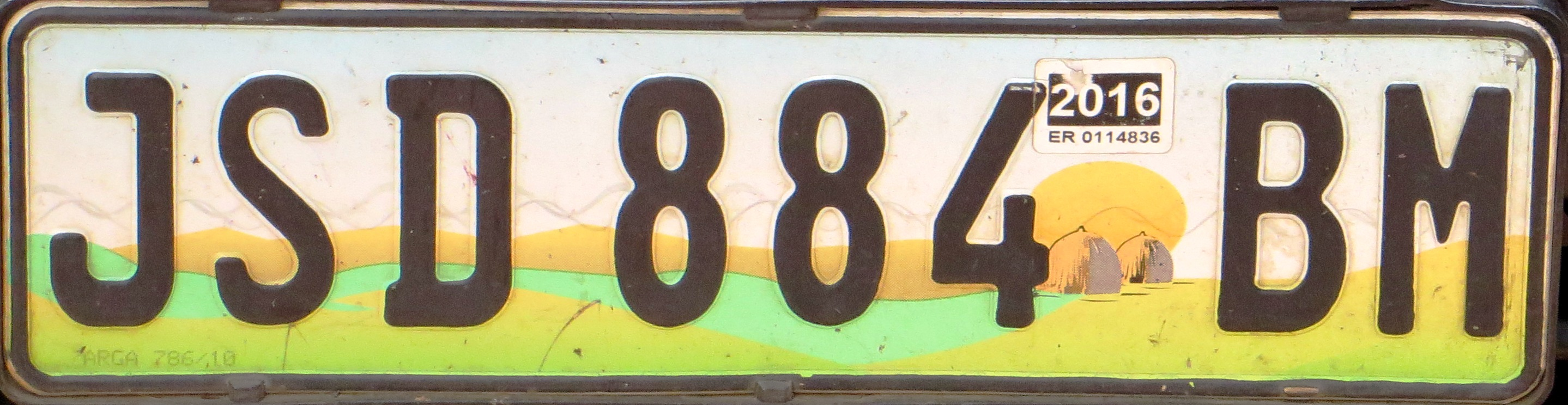
Current front plate

Number plates of Eswatini (formerly Swaziland) are similar in size to their South African counterparts and are displayed on both front and back of the vehicle.

== Current design ==
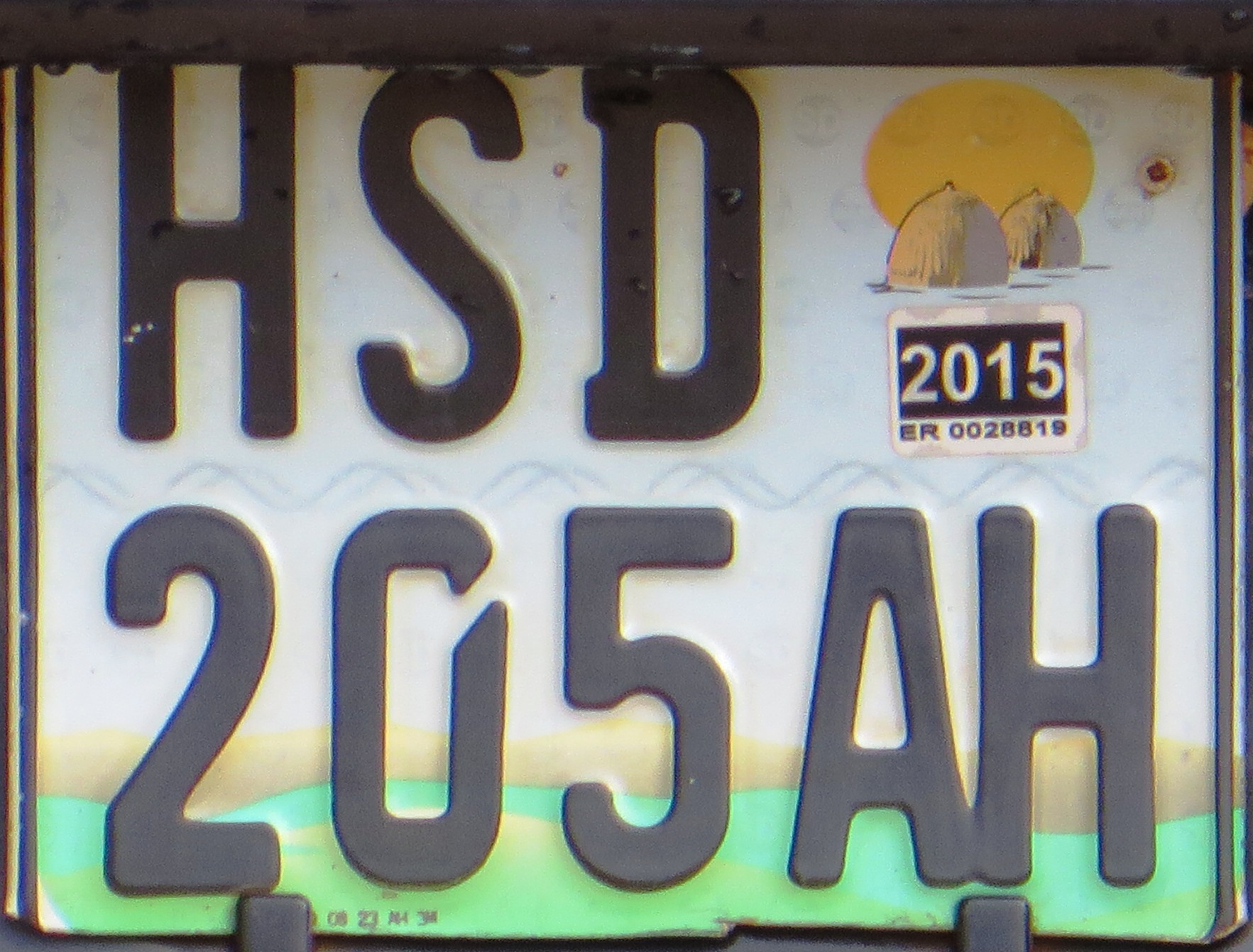
Current rear plate

The current design, introduced in 2010, closely resembles the number plates used in South Africa, purportedly in an attempt to reduce hijacking of Swazi-registered cars in that country. The introduction of these plates is somewhat controversial, with some believing them to be illegal.

Plate numbers consist of a random letter, followed by the letters SD (Note: SD indicating Swaziland), a space, three numbers, another space, and then one random letter and the first letter of the region the car is registered to. (e.g. JSD 136 AM). This allows for 26 x 10 x 10 x 10 x 26 x 26 = 17,576,000 vehicle registration numbers.

The 2010 design consists of black lettering superimposed over a pictorial image of a landscape of hills. Between the main number and the registration districts, two traditional Swazi “beehive” huts (known as Gucasithandaze) are shown over a background of the setting sun. Plates are valid for five years, and have a sticker indicating the year of expiry.

Like their counterparts in Zimbabwe, licensing requirements include a self-adhesive version of the plate that is displayed on the vehicle windshield. Unusually, this version contains a QR code that encodes the plate number.

With the change in number plates, it became possible for private citizens to obtain personalised plates.

== History ==
Before 1980 the plates for private vehicles were white-on-black (front and rear) and had up to five digits following the code SD. Royal vehicles had the code S, and government vehicles had the code GSD. Diplomatic plates had three digits following SD DC, while United Nations vehicles had the code SD UN. Most of these codes had been in use before independence in the Swaziland Protectorate.

SD 99999	SD 99999
SD CD 999	SD CD 999

Between 1980 and 2011, a black-on-yellow system was used. The previous numbering system was changed so that the last digits became letters. Diplomatic plates were yellow-on-black, but still followed the same numbering pattern.

SD 999 XX	SD 999 XX
SD CD 999	SD CD 999

Initially the two trailing letters (XX in the figures above) indicated the district of registration, however as there are only four districts of Swaziland, this system would have allowed for a maximum of 4,000 registered vehicles. As this was clearly insufficient the trailing letters were then assigned randomly and so 10 x 10 x 10 x 26 x 26 = 676,000 registration numbers could be assigned.
