= Mozirje =

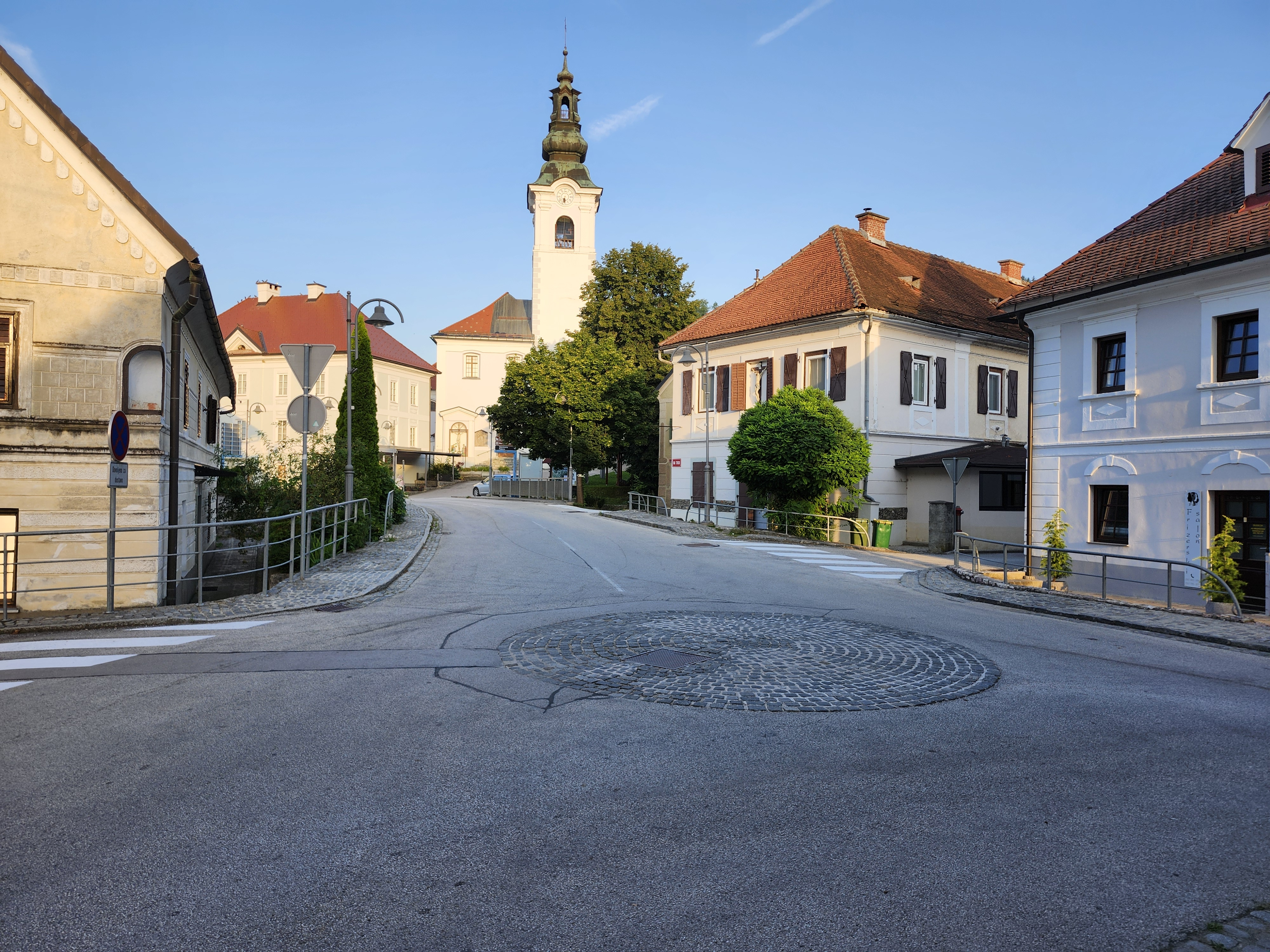
- Central street of Mozirje, with Saint George's Church

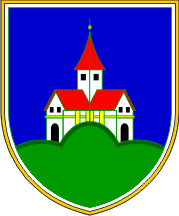
- Coat of arms

- Location in Slovenia
- Coordinates: 46°20′17″N 14°57′26″E
- Country: Slovenia
- Traditional region: Styria
- Statistical region: Savinja
- Municipality: Mozirje

Area
  - Total: 2.91 km^{2} (1.12 sq mi)
- Elevation: 339.6 m (1,114 ft)

Population (2019)
  - Total: 2,052
- Vehicle registration: CE

Mozirje (pronounced [mɔˈziːɾjɛ]; German: Prassberg) is a small town on the Savinja River in northern Slovenia. It is the seat of the Municipality of Mozirje. The area is part of the traditional region of Styria. It is now included in the Savinja Statistical Region.

== Name ==
Mozirje was mentioned in written sources in 1146 as Mosiri (and as Prossperch in 1231, Moziri in 1241, and Prasperch in 1391). The name is derived from the Slovene common noun mozirje 'swamp' and refers to the local geography. In the past the German name was Prassberg.

== Church ==
The parish church in the town is dedicated to Saint George (Slovene: sveti Jurij) and belongs to the Roman Catholic Diocese of Celje. It was first mentioned in written documents dated to 1241. The current building dates to 1754.

== Notable people ==
Notable people that were born or lived in Mozirje include:

- Janez Goličnik (1737–1807), beekeeper
