= HSwMS Loke =

Several ships of the Swedish Navy have been named HSwMS Loke, named after Loki in Norse mythology:

- HSwMS Loke (1869) was a John Ericsson-class monitor launched in 1869 and decommissioned in 1908
- HSwMS Loke (A344) was an auxiliary ship launched in 1944 and sold in 1992
- HSwMS Loke (1994) is an auxiliary ship launched in 1994
