= Loke v Tuhinju =

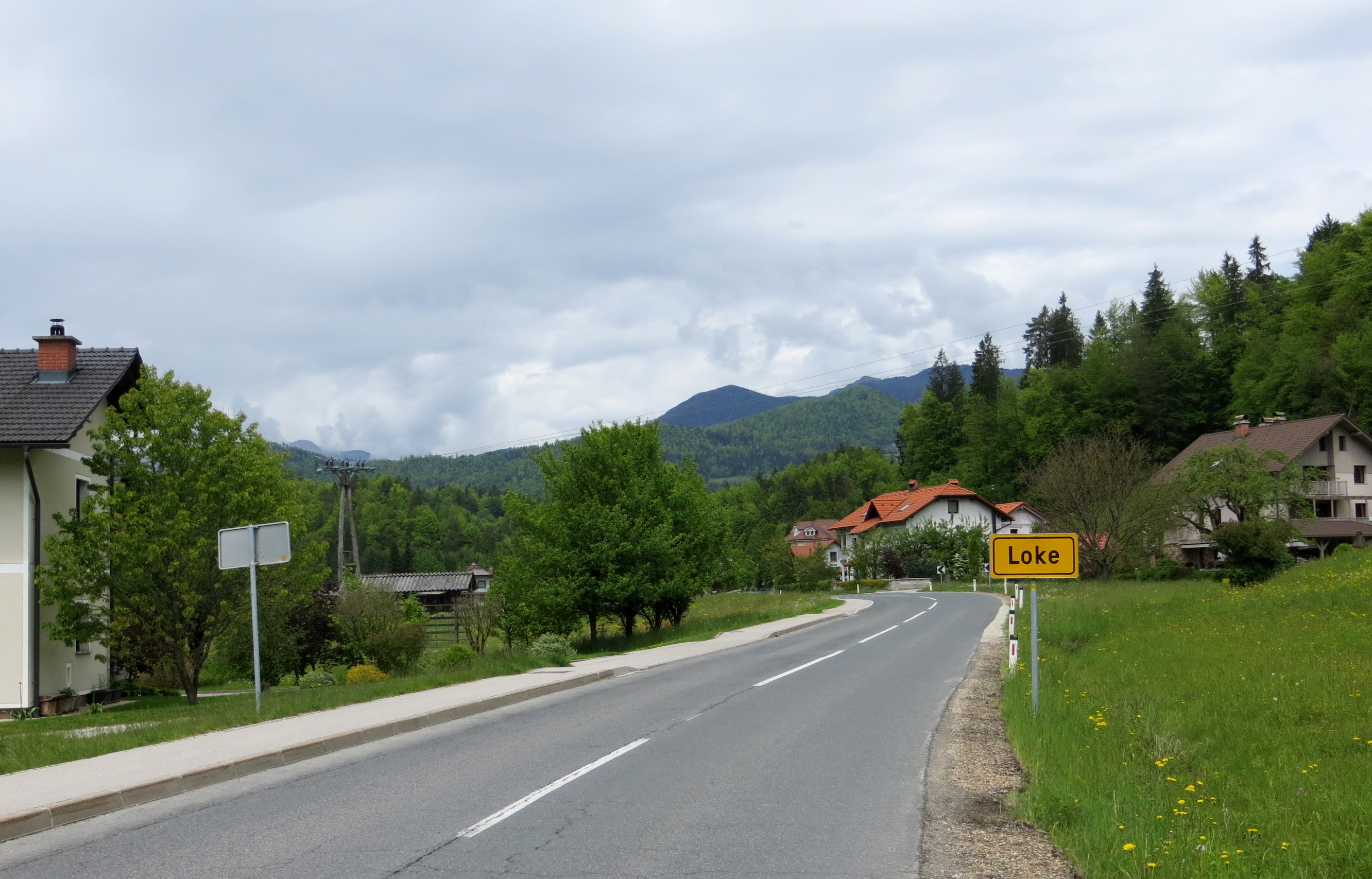

- Location in Slovenia
- Coordinates: 46°13′27.97″N 14°41′31.18″E
- Country: Slovenia
- Traditional region: Upper Carniola
- Statistical region: Central Slovenia
- Municipality: Kamnik

Area
  - Total: 1.75 km^{2} (0.68 sq mi)
- Elevation: 435 m (1,427 ft)

Population (2002)
  - Total: 180

Loke v Tuhinju (pronounced [ˈloːkɛ ʍ tuˈxiːnju]; German: Laake) is a village in the Tuhinj Valley in the Municipality of Kamnik in the Upper Carniola region of Slovenia.

== Church ==
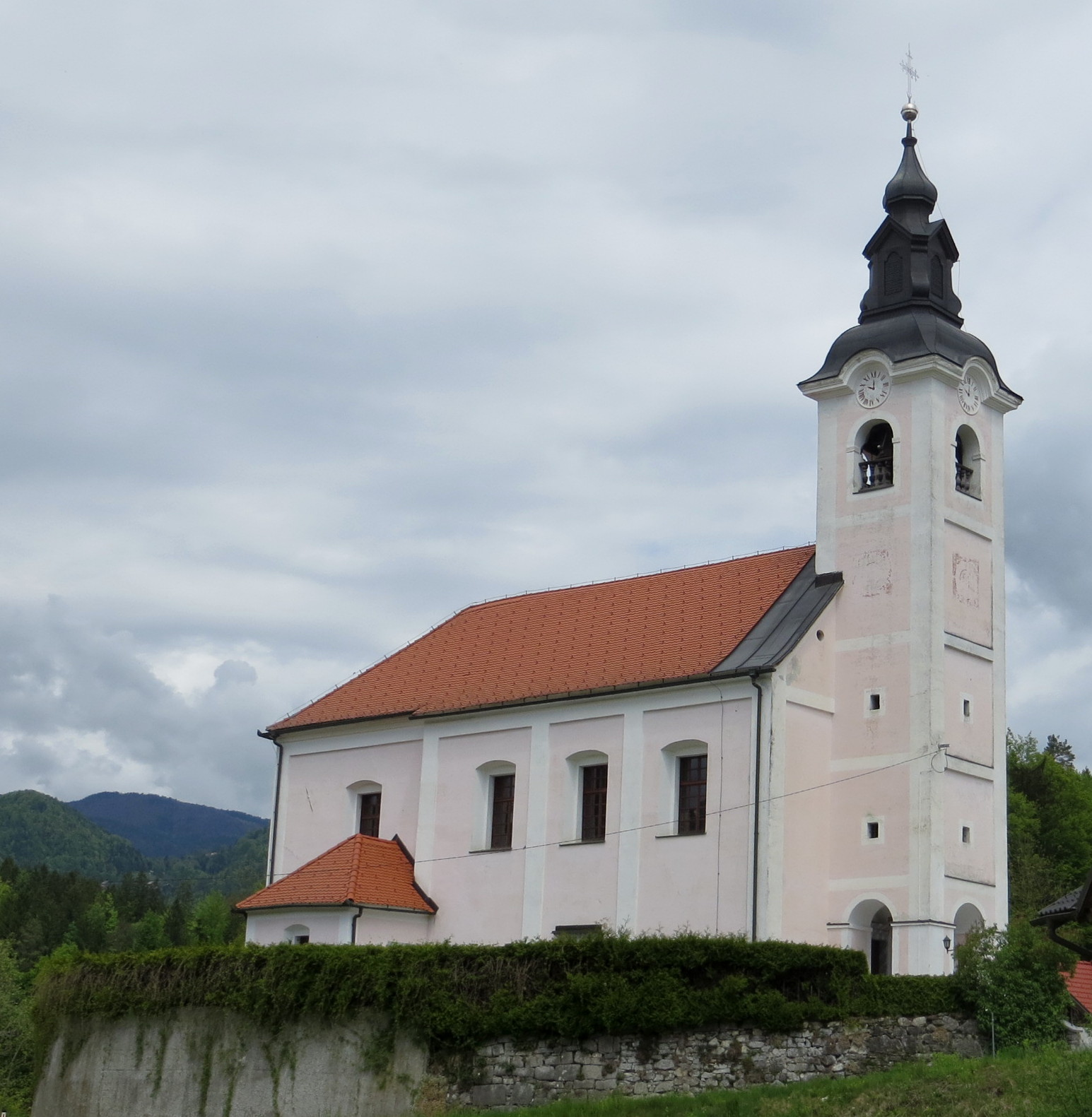
Saint Thomas's Church

The local church is dedicated to Saint Thomas. It was built in the Baroque style between 1726 and 1732. Its main altar also dates to the first half of the 18th century.
