= Loke pri Mozirju =

Loke pri Mozirju Loke (until 1955)
- Location in Slovenia
- Coordinates: 46°19′59.74″N 14°58′28.84″E
- Country: Slovenia
- Traditional region: Styria
- Statistical region: Savinja
- Municipality: Mozirje

Area
  - Total: 3.47 km^{2} (1.34 sq mi)
- Elevation: 329.4 m (1,081 ft)

Population (2002)
  - Total: 291

Loke pri Mozirju (pronounced [ˈloːkɛ pɾi mɔˈziːɾju]) is a settlement in the Municipality of Mozirje in northern Slovenia. It lies on the right bank of the Savinja River south of Mozirje. The area is part of the traditional region of Lower Styria. The municipality is now included in the Savinja Statistical Region.

== Name ==
The name of the settlement was changed from Loke to Loke pri Mozirju in 1955.
