= Løke =

Løke is a Norwegian surname. Notable people with the surname include:

- Frank Løke (born 1980), Norwegian handball player
- Heidi Løke (born 1982), Norwegian handball player, sister of Frank
