= Vehicle registration plates of Cambodia =

Kingdom of Cambodia
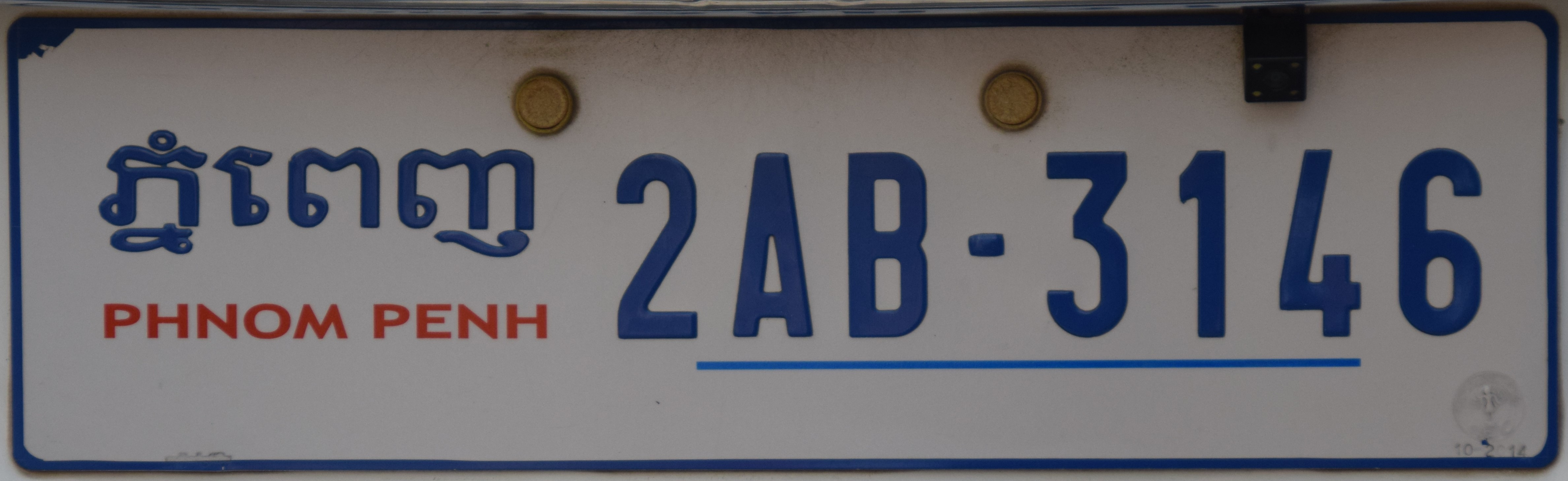
- EU-sized plate from Cambodia.
- Country: Cambodia
- Country code: KH

Current series
- Serial format: Not standard
- Colour (front): Blue on white
- Colour (rear): Blue on white

Cambodian vehicle license plates are the license plates attached to most motorized road vehicles in Cambodia, which are required by law. Cambodian license plates display the name of the province where the vehicle was registered. The owner must register the car in the province they live; this can be a different province from where the owner has his official residence (as shown in the housing register). If the title to the car is transferred to someone else, and the new owner lives in a different province, the number usually changes. Since 2009, Cambodia's official UN road code is KH (previously KMH and K).

== Types ==
=== Common types ===
The current Cambodian vehicle license plate format, used since April 1, 2004, has one class number, one or two letters of Latin alphabet, four numbers (from 0001 to 9999) and the name of the province in Khmer in which the car was registered at the top and at the bottom in English. (Ex. រតនគិរី 2D-0008 RATANAKIRI; ព្រះសីហនុ 2D-0088 PREAH SIHANOUK; ភ្នំពេញ 2D-0888 PHNOM PENH; ប.មានជ័យ 2D-8888 BANTEAY MEANCHEY). Vehicle license plate standard size commonly used (Front: 14 cm x 50 cm, Back: 16 cm x 52 cm) for Long vehicle license plate number and (Front and Back: 16 cm x 32 cm) for short vehicle license plate number.

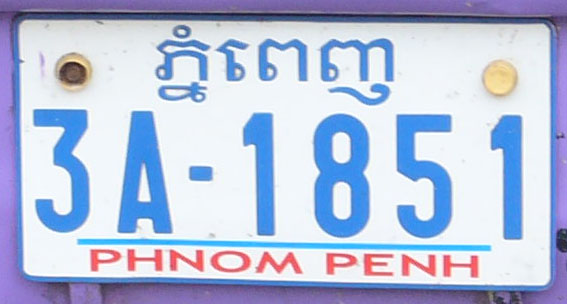
Cambodian car license plate (current style), from a bus registered in Phnom Penh - US Standard Size

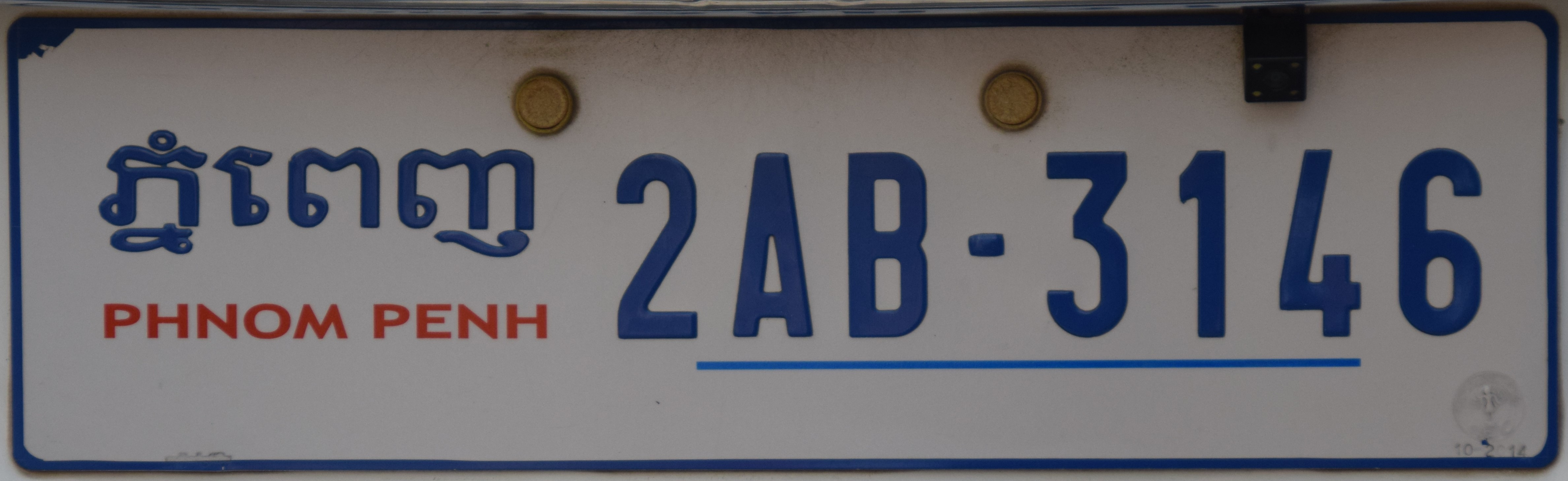
Cambodian car license plate (current style), from a car registered in Phnom Penh - EU Standard Size

Class	Plate color	Text color	First number
Motorcycles	White	Blue	1
1–7 seats private automobile*	White	Blue	2
Private automobile with more than 7 seats**	Blue	White	3
Agricultural vehicle	Green	Yellow	4
Engineering vehicle	Orange	Black	5
Truck trailer	White	Black	7
Special vehicle	White	Black	9

* Most 4-door pickups are included in this type.
** Usually a van or a lorry with more than seven seats.

There are plans to add another letter after the license plate numbers of Phnom Penh are full. For example, it starts from "1 AA 0001" to "1 AA 9999", then starts at "1 AB 0001", and continues again. In Phnom Penh, the motorcycle plate already started in 2012.

==== Personalised number plates ====
In June 2019, a sub-decree was announced allowing car owners to transfer registration plates to new vehicles, and purchase customised number plates for a premium fee.

Personalised plates are obtained via an online portal where vehicle owners search for existing plates for sale, or create a plate. Prices for customised plates can reach up to 1,000,000,000KHR (approximately US$250,000).

Custom plates feature the word កម្ពុជា "Kampuchea" and can contain up to 9 alpha-numeric characters.

The program has become a highly lucrative source of revenue for the Ministry of Public Works and Transport, raising more than US$70M net through sales of personalised number plates from 2019 to February 2022

==== International Organisations & Non Government Organisations ====
NGOs and international organisations can be issued plates signifying their organisational status. Plates are light blue with white text, with the designation ONG or OI in capital letters, representing the French spelling, Organisation Non Gouvernementale and Organisation Internationale.

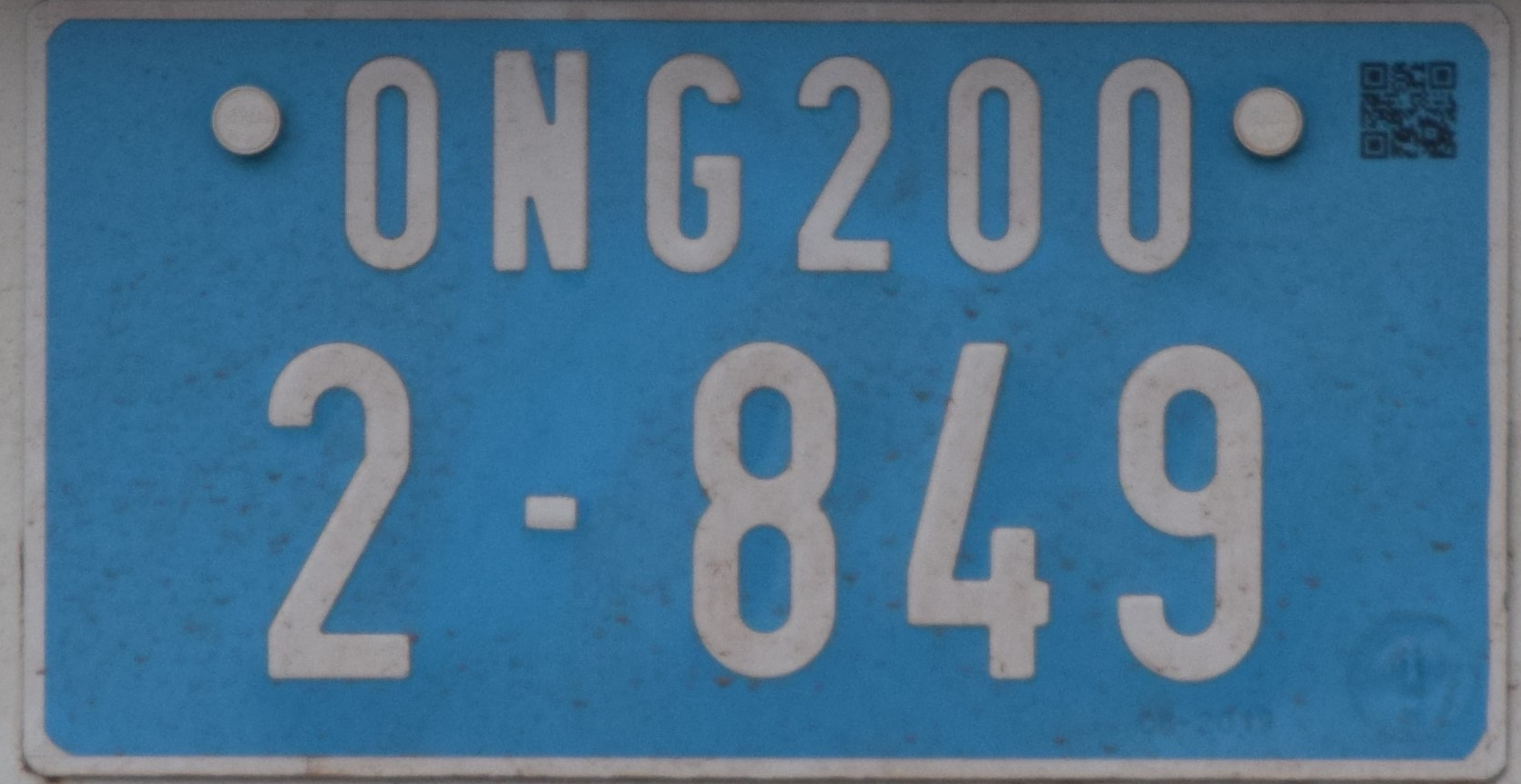
Cambodia license plate non government international organisation car

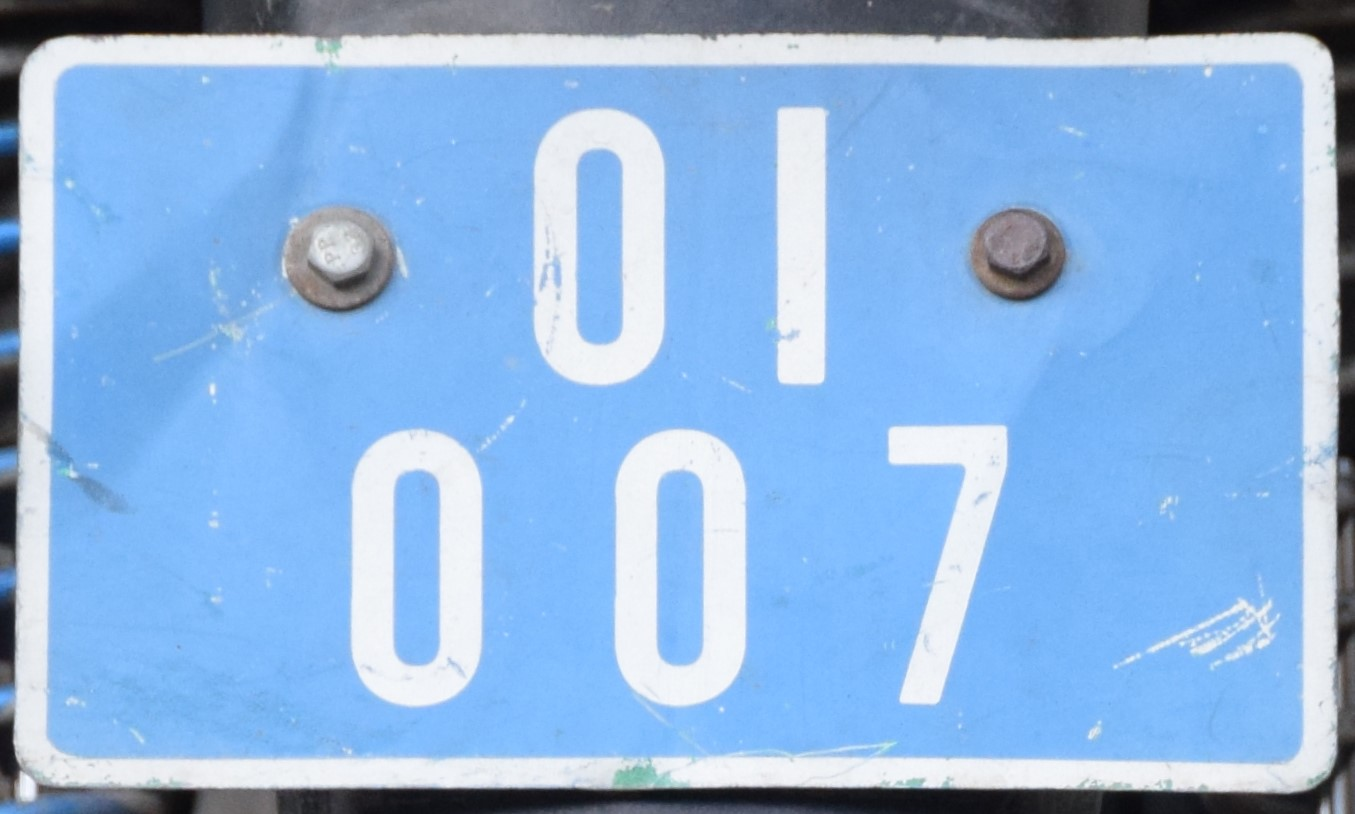
Cambodia license plate international organisation motorcycle

=== Police ===
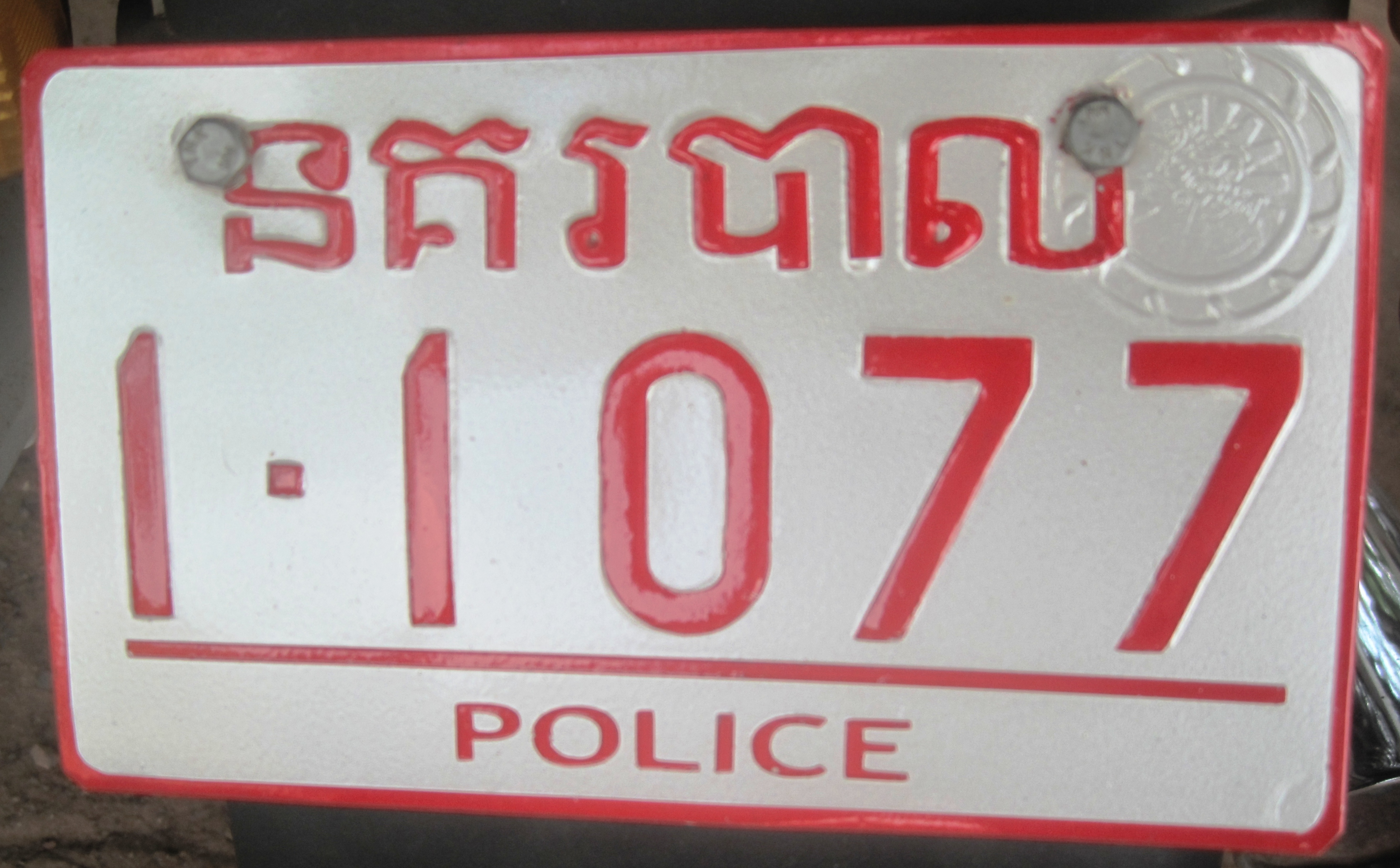
License plate of the Cambodian police

Cars owned by the police get the red plate with "នគរបាល" as the province of registration.

=== Embassy and consulate ===
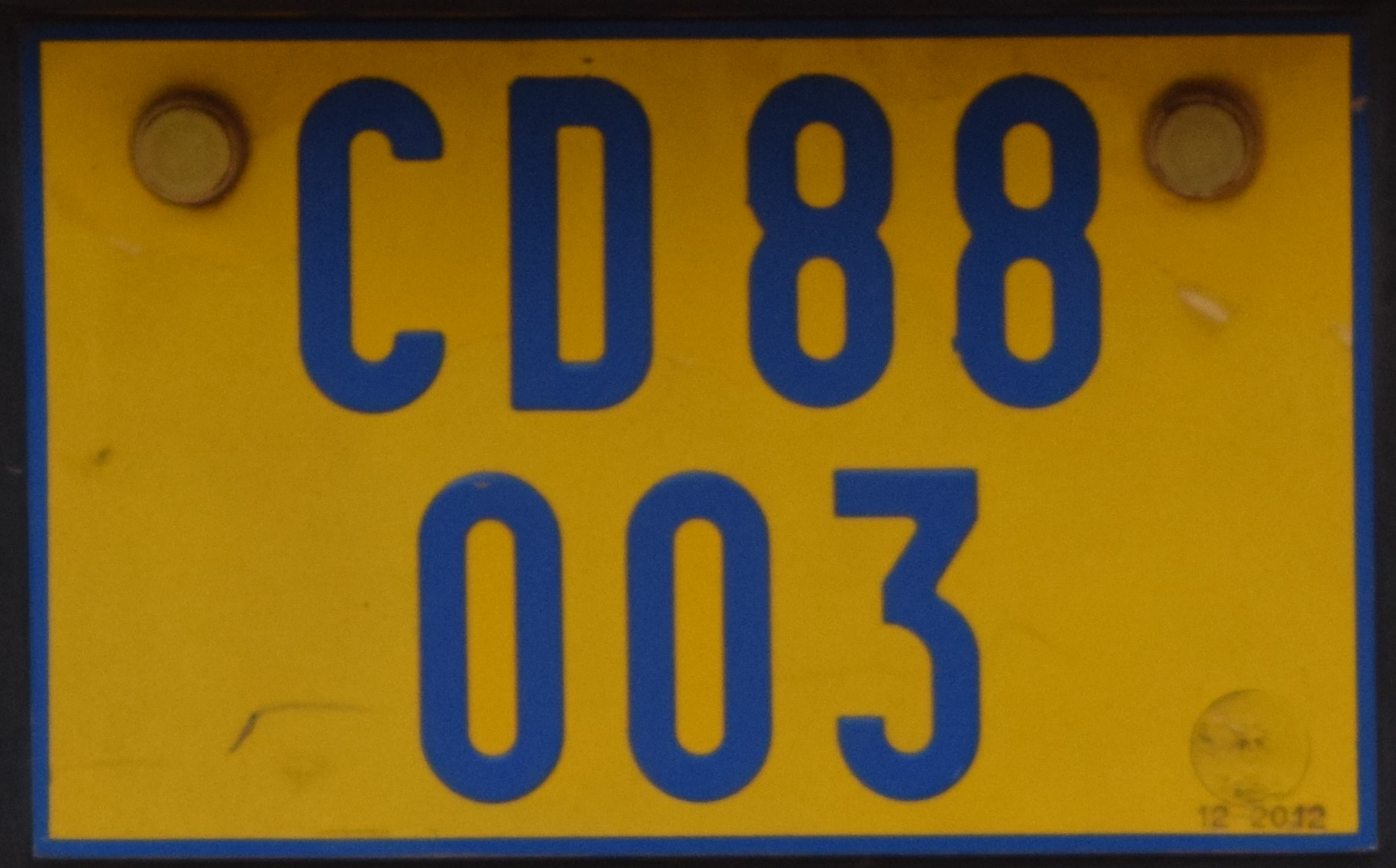
CD License plate

Embassy and consulate vehicles have their own license plates with a yellow background and blue text.

=== Royal vehicles ===
The royal family's license plate has two yellow letters in Khmer script (រវ) and three yellow numbers on a blue plate.

=== Temporary plates ===
Until 1993, new cars not yet getting the real plate get the five-digit number plate.

When people use registered cars temporarily outside Cambodia, they may have English temporary plates. The English plates are the same number as the real plates and used for that car only. The plate has the province name in English at the bottom, instead of in Khmer. Today this is used for every car.

== State Plates ==
Government vehicles use state plates which include the word State,(រដ្ឋ) and numerical designation for the administrative body responsible.

Plate number	State body (Khmer)	State body
រដ្ឋ-01	ព្រឹទ្ធសភា	Senate
រដ្ឋ-02	រដ្ឋសភា	State Assembly
រដ្ឋ-03	រាជរដ្ឋាភិបាល	Royal Government
រដ្ឋ-04	ក្រុមប្រឹក្សាធម្មនុញ្ញ	Constitutional Council
រដ្ឋ-05	ទីស្តីការគណរដ្ឋមន្រ្តី	Office of the Council of Ministers
រដ្ឋ-06	ក្រសួងការពារជាតិ	Ministry of National Defense
រដ្ឋ-07	ក្រសួងមហាផ្ទៃ	Ministry of Interior
រដ្ឋ-08	ក្រសួងទំនាក់ទំនងរដ្ឋសភា-ព្រឹទ្ធសភា និងអធិការកិច្ច	Ministry of National Assembly-Senate Relations and Inspection
រដ្ឋ-09	ក្រសួងការបរទេស និងសហប្រតិបត្តិការ	Ministry of Foreign Affairs and International Cooperation
រដ្ឋ-10	ក្រសួងសេដ្ឋកិច្ច និងហិរញ្ញវត្ថុ	Ministry of Economy and Finance
រដ្ឋ-11	ក្រសួងពត៌មាន	Ministry of Information
រដ្ឋ-12	ក្រសួងសុខាភិបាល	Ministry of Health
រដ្ឋ-13	ក្រសួងរ៉ែ និងថាមពល	Ministry of Mines and Energy
រដ្ឋ-14	ក្រសួងផែនការ	Ministry of Planning
រដ្ឋ-15	ក្រសួងពាណិជ្ជកម្ម	Ministry of Commerce
រដ្ឋ-16	ក្រសួងអប់រំ យុវជន និងកីឡា	Ministry of Education, Youth and Sports
រដ្ឋ-17	ក្រសួងកសិកម្ម រុក្ខាប្រមាញ់ និងនេសាទ	Ministry of Agriculture, Forestry and Fisheries
រដ្ឋ-18	ក្រសួងវប្បធម៌ និងវិចិត្រសិល្បៈ	Ministry of Culture and Fine Arts
រដ្ឋ-19	ក្រសួងបរិស្ថាន	Ministry of Environment
រដ្ឋ-20	ក្រសួងអភិវឌ្ឍន៍ជនបទ	Ministry of Rural Development
រដ្ឋ-21	ក្រសួងសង្គមកិច្ច អតីតយុទ្ធជន និងយុវនីតិសម្បទា	Ministry of Social Affairs, Veterans and Youth Rehabilitation
រដ្ឋ-22	ក្រសួងប្រៃសណីយ៍ និងទូរគមនាគមន៍	Ministry of Posts and Telecommunications
រដ្ឋ-23	ក្រសួងធម្មការ និងសាសនា	Ministry of Culture and Fine Arts
រដ្ឋ-24	ក្រសួងកិច្ចការនារី	Ministry of Women's Affairs
រដ្ឋ-25	ក្រសួងសាធារណការ និងដឹកជញ្ជូន	Ministry of Public Works and Transport
រដ្ឋ-26	ក្រសួងយុត្តិធម៌	Ministry of Justice
រដ្ឋ-27	ក្រសួងទេសចរណ៍	Ministry of Tourism
រដ្ឋ-28	ក្រសួងរៀបចំដែនដី នគរូបនីយកម្ម និងសំណង់	Ministry of Land Management, Urban Planning and Construction
រដ្ឋ-29	ក្រសួងធនធានទឹក និងឧត្តុនិយម	Ministry of Water Resources and Meteorology
រដ្ឋ-30	ក្រសួងព្រះបរមរាជវាំង	Ministry of Royal Palace
រដ្ឋ-31	ក្រសួងមុខងារសាធារណៈ	Ministry of Civil Service
រដ្ឋ-32	រដ្ឋលេធិការដ្ឋានអាការចរស៊ីវិល	State Secretariat of Civil Aviation
រដ្ឋ-33	ឧត្តមក្រុមប្រឹក្សាចៅក្រម	Supreme Council of Judges
រដ្ឋ-34	អគ្គលេខាដ្ឋានរដ្ឋសភា-ព្រឹទ្ធសភា	General Secretariat of the National Assembly-Senate
រដ្ឋ-35	ធនាគារជាតិនៃកម្ពុជា	National Bank of Cambodia
រដ្ឋ-36	អង្គការជាតិ	National Organization
រដ្ឋ-37	រាជធានីភ្នំពេញ	Phnom Penh Capital
រដ្ឋ-38	ខេត្តកណ្តាល	Kandal Province
រដ្ឋ-39	ខេត្តកំពង់ធំ	Kampong Thom Province
រដ្ឋ-40	ខេត្តកំពង់ឆ្នាំង	Kampong Chhnang Province
រដ្ឋ-41	ខេត្តកំពង់ស្ពឺ	Kampong Speu Province
រដ្ឋ-42	ខេត្តកំពង់ចាម	Kampong Cham Province
រដ្ឋ-43	ខេត្តកំពត	Kampot Province
រដ្ឋ-44	ខេត្តកោះកុង	Koh Kong Province
រដ្ឋ-45	ខេត្តកែប	Kep Province
រដ្ឋ-46	ខេត្តក្រចេះ	Kratie Province
រដ្ឋ-47	ខេត្តតាកែវ	Takeo Province
រដ្ឋ-48	ខេត្តបន្ទាយមានជ័យ	Banteay Meanchey Province
រដ្ឋ-49	ខេត្តបាត់ដំបង	Battambang Province
រដ្ឋ-50	ខេត្តប៉ៃលិន	Pailin Province
រដ្ឋ-51	ខេត្តពោធិ៍សាត់	Pursat Province
រដ្ឋ-52	ខេត្តព្រះសីហនុ	Preah Sihanouk Province
រដ្ឋ-53	ខេត្តព្រះវិហារ	Preah Vihear Province
រដ្ឋ-54	ខេត្តព្រៃវែង	Prey Veng Province
រដ្ឋ-55	ខេត្តមណ្ឌលគិរី	Mondulkiri Province
រដ្ឋ-56	ខេត្តរតនគិរី	Rattanakiri Province
រដ្ឋ-57	ខេត្តសៀមរាប	Siem Reap Province
រដ្ឋ-58	ខេត្តស្វាយរៀង	Svay Rieng Province
រដ្ឋ-59	ខេត្តស្ទឹងត្រែង	Steung Treng Province
រដ្ឋ-60	ខេត្តឧត្តរមានជ័យ	Oddar Meanchey Province
រដ្ឋ-61	ក្រសួងការងារ និងបណ្តុះបណ្តាលវិជ្ជាជីវៈ	Ministry of Labor and Vocational Training

== Location names ==
Cambodian license plates use the Khmer name of the province where its owner (a person or company) is located or registered.

Province	Name on plate	
Province	Khmer	English
Banteay Meanchey	ប.មានជ័យ	BANTEAY MEANCHEY
Battambang	បាត់ដំបង	BATTAMBANG
Kampong Cham	កំពង់ចាម	KAMPONG CHAM
Kampong Chhnang	កំពង់ឆ្នាំង	KAMPONG CHHNANG
Kampong Speu	កំពង់ស្ពឺ	KAMPONG SPEU
Kampong Thom	កំពង់ធំ	KAMPONG THOM
Kampot	កំពត	KAMPOT
Kandal	កណ្ដាល	KANDAL
Kep	កែប	KEP
Koh Kong	កោះកុង	KOH KONG
Kratié	ក្រចេះ	KRATIE
Mondulkiri	មណ្ឌលគិរី	MONDULKIRI
Oddar Meanchey	ឧ.មានជ័យ	ODDAR MEANCHEY
Pailin	ប៉ែលិន	PAILIN
Phnom Penh	ភ្នំពេញ	PHNOM PENH
Preah Vihear	ព្រះវិហារ	PREAH VIHEAR
Preah Sihanouk	ព្រះសីហនុ	PREAH SIHANOUK
Prey Veng	ព្រៃវែង	PREY VENG
Pursat	ពោធិ៍សាត់	PURSAT
Ratanakiri	រតនគិរី	RATANAKIRI
Siem Reap	សៀមរាប	SIEM REAP
Stung Treng	ស្ទឹងត្រែង	STUNG TRENG
Svay Rieng	ស្វាយរៀង	SVAY RIENG
Takéo	តាកែវ	TAKEO
Tboung Khmum	ត្បូងឃ្មុំ	TBOUNG KHMUM
