= Dobrovlje pri Mozirju =

Dobrovlje pri Mozirju Dobrovlje (until 1955)
- Location in Slovenia
- Coordinates: 46°19′6.3″N 14°58′46.63″E
- Country: Slovenia
- Traditional region: Styria
- Statistical region: Savinja
- Municipality: Mozirje

Area
  - Total: 3.91 km^{2} (1.51 sq mi)
- Elevation: 640.3 m (2,101 ft)

Population (2002)
  - Total: 60

Dobrovlje pri Mozirju (pronounced [dɔˈbɾoːu̯ljɛ pɾi mɔˈziːɾju]) is a dispersed settlement in the Municipality of Mozirje in northern Slovenia. It lies in the hills above the right bank of the Savinja River south of Mozirje. The area is part of the traditional region of Styria. The municipality is now included in the Savinja Statistical Region.

== Name ==
The name of the settlement was changed from Dobrovlje to Dobrovlje pri Mozirju in 1955.
