= Šmihel nad Mozirjem =

Šmihel nad Mozirjem Šmihel (until 1955)
- Location in Slovenia
- Coordinates: 46°22′17.58″N 14°56′47.21″E
- Country: Slovenia
- Traditional region: Styria
- Statistical region: Savinja
- Municipality: Mozirje

Area
  - Total: 11.64 km^{2} (4.49 sq mi)
- Elevation: 762.6 m (2,502 ft)

Population (2002)
  - Total: 168

Šmihel nad Mozirjem (pronounced [ʃmiˈxeːu̯ nad mɔˈziːɾjɛm]) is a settlement in the Municipality of Mozirje in northern Slovenia. It lies below the Golte Hills north of Mozirje. The area is part of the traditional region of Styria. The municipality is now included in the Savinja Statistical Region.

== Name ==
The name of the settlement was changed from Šmihel to Šmihel nad Mozirjem in 1955.

== Church ==
The parish church from which the settlement gets its name is dedicated to Saint Michael and belongs to the Roman Catholic Diocese of Celje. It dates to the 17th century.
