= Canadian licence plate designs and serial formats =

In Canada, licence plate numbers are usually assigned in ascending order, beginning with a starting point such as AAA-001.

As such, someone familiar with the sequence can determine roughly when the licence plate was issued. After Ontario's transition to an ABCD-123 format in 1997, plates were issued in ascending order starting with AAAA-000. It took close to 10 years to exhaust the supply of plate numbers with A as the first digit. In late 2006, plates with B as the first digit were assigned, and have continued from there sequentially. Plates with C as the first digit started appearing in 2016. The first plates beginning with D were issued in 2023.

The gradual increase in the use of letters in the serials of licence plates has given rise to an increased possibility of unintentional profane or inappropriate words or messages arising from the use of sequential alphanumeric combinations. Thus, numbering sequences generally exclude certain combinations of letters or numbers that would be potentially offensive. Jurisdictions' attention to excluding offensive combinations varies widely, however. In 1986, Waldale, a Canadian licence plate manufacturer, due to a production error, produced an entire batch of New Brunswick plates that began with the letters ASS. The plates were issued, and were unofficially scrapped, but many found their way into the collectors' black market.

From 1971 to 1975, Manitoba's licence plate bore the slogan "Sunny Manitoba: 100,000 lakes," but was changed to "Friendly Manitoba," possibly due to conflict with Minnesota's "10,000 lakes" slogan.

== Current designs and serial formats ==
The most recent design or serial format being issued.

=== Passenger plates ===
Province/Territory	First issued	Description	Slogan	Serial format	Image
Alberta	2021	Red on reflective white	"Wild Rose Country"	ABC-1234	
British Columbia	2014	Blue on reflective white with screened stylized provincial flag in centre	"Beautiful British Columbia"	A12 3BC	
Manitoba	2012	Embossed dark blue serial on reflective white plate with river scene featuring green trees on either side and yellow wheat at the bottom; black bison graphic screened at top right; "Manitoba" screened in blue at top, offset to right, with red maple leaf over the 'i'	"Friendly Manitoba"	ABC 123	
New Brunswick	2011	Embossed red serial on reflective white plate with curved gold and sky blue bands at the top; screened provincial wordmark (red galley graphic with small blue waves and "New" to the left, "Nouveau" to the right and "Brunswick" and "CANADA" below, all in green) on bands, centred above serial	—N/a	ABC 123	
Newfoundland and Labrador	2007–21 2023–present	Embossed blue serial on white plate; screened provincial wordmark centred at bottom, consisting of a pitcher plant with "Newfoundland" and "Labrador" in blue below	—N/a	ABC 123	
Northwest Territories	2010	screened nature scene, shaped like a polar bear	"Spectacular Northwest Territories"	123456	
Nova Scotia	2011	Embossed blue serial on reflective white plate; light blue graphic of the Bluenose screened in the centre; "NOVA SCOTIA" screened in blue centred at top	"Canada's Ocean Playground"	ABC 123	
Nunavut	2012	Screened black serial on rectangular plate with night scene featuring polar bear, inuksuk, three sets of northern lights and 25 stars; "Nunavut" screened in black letters and in Inuktitut syllabics (ᓄᓇᕗᑦ) centred at bottom	—N/a	123 456	
Ontario	1997–2020; 2020–present	Blue on reflective white with screened crown separator; "ONTARIO" screened in blue centred at top	"Yours to Discover"	ABCD-123	
Ontario	1997–2020; 2020–present	Blue on reflective white with screened crown separator; "ONTARIO" screened in blue centred at top	"Tant à Découvrir"	ABCD-123	
Ontario	1997–2020; 2020–present	Green on reflective white with screened graphic of white trillium; for hydrogen and plug-in electric vehicles	"Green Vehicle"	**GV**AB 123	
Ontario	1997–2020; 2020–present	Green on reflective white with screened graphic of white trillium; for hydrogen and plug-in electric vehicles	"Véhicule écologique"	**VE**AB 123	
Prince Edward Island	2022	Green letters on white baseplate; 'PRINCE EDWARD ISLAND' screened at top & 'CANADA' along bottom. PEI crest in center and small Canadian flag in bottom left.	none	123 ABC	
Quebec	2023	Embossed dark blue serial on reflective white plate with border line; "Québec" centred at top	"Je me souviens" (I Remember)	ABC 12D	
Quebec	2011	green on reflective white with electric vehicle pictogram on the lower left side (for electric vehicles)	"Je me souviens" (I Remember)	Began as B12 **VE**A, followed by C12 **V**AB	
Saskatchewan	2009	Green on reflective white with screened wheat graphic in centre; serif "Saskatchewan" screened in green centred at top	"Land of Living Skies"	123 ABC	
Yukon	1990	Black on reflective white with border line; screened prospector at left; screened red "Yukon" centred on sky blue band at bottom	"The Klondike"	ABC12	
Department of National Defence - All provinces and territories		dark green on reflective white with "Canada" on top flanked by two red maple leaves	—N/a	12345	

Note: For Ontario and Quebec electric vehicle plates, letters in bold denotes that they are specifically set to identify them, apart from the regular issuance.

=== Commercial plates ===
Most provinces issue separate commercial plates for trucks, usually for commercial purposes or over a certain vehicle weight.

Province/Territory	First issued	Description	Slogan	Serial format	Image
Alberta		none			
British Columbia	2008	Blue on reflective white with screened stylized provincial flag used as separator	"Beautiful British Columbia"	AB 1234	
Manitoba	2012	Embossed dark blue serial on reflective white plate with river scene featuring green trees on either side and yellow wheat at the bottom; black bison graphic screened at top right; "Manitoba" screened in blue at top, offset to right, with red maple leaf over the 'i'	"Friendly Manitoba"	**C**AB 123	
New Brunswick	2011	Embossed red serial on reflective white plate with curved gold and sky blue bands at the top; screened provincial wordmark (red galley graphic with small blue waves and "New" to the left, "Nouveau" to the right and "Brunswick" and "CANADA" below, all in green) on bands, centred above serial	—N/a	**C**AB 123	
Newfoundland and Labrador	2007	Embossed blue serial on white plate; screened provincial wordmark centred at bottom, consisting of a pitcher plant with "Newfoundland" and "Labrador" in blue below	—N/a	**C**A1 234	
Northwest Territories	2010	screened nature scene, shaped like a polar bear	"Spectacular Northwest Territories"	**C**12345	
Nova Scotia	2012	Embossed black serial on yellow plate; "NOVA SCOTIA" and "COMMERCIAL" centred at top and bottom respectively	—N/a	12-345-A	
Nunavut	2012	Screened black serial on rectangular plate with night scene featuring polar bear, inuksuk, three sets of northern lights and 25 stars; "Nunavut" screened in black letters and in Inuktitut syllabics (ᓄᓇᕗᑦ) centred at bottom	—N/a	**C**12 345	
Ontario	2011	Black on reflective white with screened crown separator	"YOURS TO DISCOVER"	AB 12345	
Ontario	2011	Black on reflective white with screened crown separator	"TANT À DÉCOUVRIR"	AB 12345	
Prince Edward Island	2013	Embossed light brown numbers on reflective white with photo of Province House on the left	"Birthplace of Confederation"	**C**1 234	
Quebec	2001	Embossed dark blue serial on reflective white plate with border line; "Québec" centred at top	"Je me souviens"	**F**AB1234	
Saskatchewan		none			
Yukon	1990	Light Commercial - Black on reflective white with border line; screened prospector at left; screened red "Yukon" centred on sky blue band at bottom	—N/a	**C**123A	
Yukon	2009	Heavy Commercial - Black on reflective white with border line; screened prospector at left; screened red "Yukon" centred on sky blue band at bottom	—N/a	**C**A123	

== Former designs and serial formats still valid ==
Designs or serial formats that are no longer issued, yet are still valid for use.

Province/Territory	Dates Issued	Description	Slogan	Serial format	Image
Alberta	1983-92	red on reflective white	"Wild Rose Country"	ABC-123	
Alberta	1993-2010	red on non-reflective white	"Wild Rose Country"	ABC-123	
Alberta	2010-19	red on non-reflective white	"Wild Rose Country"	ABC-1234	
Alberta	2019-21	as above, but with newer Alberta government logo	"Wild Rose Country"	ABC-1234	
British Columbia	1985-2001	Blue on reflective white with screened stylized provincial flag in centre	"Beautiful British Columbia"	ABC 123	
British Columbia	2001-14	Blue on reflective white with screened stylized provincial flag in centre	"Beautiful British Columbia"	123 ABC	
British Columbia	2014-25	Blue on reflective white with screened stylized provincial flag in centre	"Beautiful British Columbia"	AB1 23C	
Manitoba	1997-2012	Embossed dark blue serial on reflective white plate with river scene featuring green trees on either side and yellow wheat at the bottom; blue bison graphic screened at top right; "Manitoba" screened in blue at top, offset to right, with red maple leaf over the 'i'	"Friendly Manitoba"	ABC 123	
New Brunswick	2003-09	Embossed red serial on reflective white plate; screened provincial wordmark ("New" to the left of the galley, "Nouveau" to the right and "Brunswick" and "CANADA" below)	—N/a	ABC-123	
New Brunswick	2009-11	Embossed red serial on reflective white plate with curved gold and sky blue bands at the top; screened provincial wordmark (red galley graphic with small blue waves and "New" to the left, "Nouveau" to the right and "Brunswick" and "CANADA" below, all in green) on bands, centred above serial	"Be...in this place - Être...ici on le peut'"	ABC 123	
Newfoundland and Labrador	1982-93	red and blue embossed on white	—N/a	ABC-123	
Newfoundland and Labrador	1993-96	red on reflective white with screened Viking ship graphic	"A World of Difference"	ABC 123	
Newfoundland and Labrador	1996-97	red on reflective blue/white with screened Cabot graphic	"Celebrate 500 Years"	ABC 123	
Newfoundland and Labrador	1997-2001	As 1993–96 base	"A WORLD OF DIFFERENCE" as from 1993 to 1996	ABC 123	
Newfoundland and Labrador	2001-02	Embossed red serial on white plate; screened provincial flag centred slightly below serial; "NEWFOUNDLAND & LABRADOR CANADA" screened in red below flag	—N/a	ABC 123	
Newfoundland and Labrador	2002-03	As above, but with "NEWFOUNDLAND & LABRADOR" centred at top, and "CANADA" increased in size	—N/a	ABC 123	
Newfoundland and Labrador	2003-07	red on reflective white with screened provincial flag graphic	—N/a	ABC 123	
Newfoundland and Labrador	2022-23	Embossed blue serial on white and teal gradient plate; screened blue graphic of a whale; screened red provincial word mark on top; screened red “COME HOME 2022” on bottom	"COME HOME 2022"	ABC 123	
Northwest Territories		none			
Nova Scotia		blue on white	"Canada's Ocean Playground"	ABC 123	
Nunavut		none			
Ontario	1973–78	Embossed blue serial with crown separator on white plate with border line; "ONTARIO" centred at top; "73" at bottom left and full sticker box at bottom right	"KEEP IT BEAUTIFUL"	ABC 123	
Ontario	1978-82	As above, but without "73", and with partial sticker box at bottom right	"KEEP IT BEAUTIFUL"	ABC 123	
Ontario	1982-86	As above, but with no sticker box	"YOURS TO DISCOVER"	ABC 123	
Ontario	1986-94	As above, but with no sticker box	"YOURS TO DISCOVER"	123 ABC	
Ontario	1994–97	Blue on reflective white with screened crown separator; "ONTARIO" screened in blue centred at top	"YOURS TO DISCOVER"	123 ABC	
Ontario	2020	white on reflective, two-hue blue with white stylized trillium separator and white crown placed bottom right	"A Place to Grow"	ABCD 123	
Prince Edward Island	1981-92	Embossed green serial with provincial shield separator on reflective white plate; border lines around plate and around bottom corners; "PRINCE EDWARD ISLAND" at top and "CANADA" centred at bottom	—N/a	ABC 123	
Prince Edward Island	1993–97	Embossed red serial on reflective white plate; green and red Anne of Green Gables graphic slightly to left of centre; "PRINCE EDWARD ISLAND" screened in red at top	"Home of Anne of Green Gables"	AB 123	
Prince Edward Island	1997-2007	Embossed green serial on reflective gradient green, white and blue plate; screened Confederation Bridge graphic at top centre and national flag at bottom left; "Prince Edward Island" screened in green below graphic with green trees, wavy blue underline, and "CANADA" below underline	"Confederation Bridge"	AB 123	
Prince Edward Island	1997-2007	As above, but with screened Province House graphic at top centre	"Birthplace of Confederation"	AB 123	
Prince Edward Island	2007-09	Embossed green numbers on reflective white plate with screened photo of windmills	"Canada's Green Province" at bottom	AB 123	
Prince Edward Island	2009-12	Embossed green numbers on reflective white plate with screened photo of windmills	"Canada's Green Province" at bottom	123 AB	
Prince Edward Island	2013-22	Embossed light brown numbers on reflective white with photo of Province House on the left	"Birthplace of Confederation"	12 3AB	
Prince Edward Island	2013-22	Embossed light brown numbers on reflective white with photo of Province House on the left	"Berceau de la Confédération"	12 3AB	
Québec	1979–83	Embossed blue serial on reflective white plate with border line; "79" at top left; fleur-de-lys and "Québec" at top right	"Je me souviens"	123A456 (1979 series only)	
Québec	1983-96	As above, but with wider serial dies, a darker shade of blue, and fleur-de-lys and "Québec" centred at top	"Je me souviens"	ABC 123	
Québec	1996-2009	As above, but with wider serial dies, a darker shade of blue, and fleur-de-lys and "Québec" centred at top	"Je me souviens"	123 ABC	
Québec	2009-22	As above, but with wider serial dies, a darker shade of blue, and fleur-de-lys and "Québec" centred at top	"Je me souviens"	A12 BCD	
Québec	2022-23	As above, but with wider serial dies, a darker shade of blue, and fleur-de-lys and "Québec" centred at top	"Je me souviens"	01B ACD	
Saskatchewan	1977-98	Green on reflective white with screened wheat graphic in centre; sans-serif "Saskatchewan" screened in green centred at top	"Land Of the Living Skies"	ABC 123	
Saskatchewan	1998-2009	Green on reflective white with screened wheat graphic in centre; serif "Saskatchewan" screened in green centred at top	"Land Of the Living Skies"	123 ABC	
Yukon		none			

== See also ==
- U.S. license plate designs and serial formats
