= List of provincial and territorial nicknames in Canada =

This partial list of provincial and territorial nicknames in Canada compiles the nicknames, sobriquets, and slogans that the provinces and territories are known by (or have been known by historically), officially and unofficially, to provincial and territorial governments, local people, outsiders, tourism boards, or chambers of commerce.

Provincial and territorial nicknames can help in establishing a provincial or territorial identity, helping outsiders recognize a community or attracting people to a community because of its nickname; promoting provincial or territorial pride; and building community unity. They are also believed to have economic value, but their economic value is difficult to measure.

Some unofficial nicknames are positive, while others are derisive. The unofficial nicknames listed here have been in use for a long time or have gained wide use.

== Provinces ==
=== Alberta ===
==== Official Nicknames/Slogans ====
- "The Energy Province" – Alberta produces most of Canada's crude oil and natural gas, as well as a large share of its coal.
- "The Sunshine Province"
- "The Princess Province"
- "Wild Rose Country" – currently used on its licence plates.

==== Unofficial Nicknames/Slogans ====
- "Texas of the North" – referring to Alberta's significance as an oil producer in Canada, similar to that of Texas in the US. The name is also used in reference to the province notably leaning to the political right, which is comparable to Texas.

=== British Columbia ===
==== Official Nicknames/Slogans ====
- "Beautiful British Columbia" – currently used on its licence plates.
- "B.C."

==== Former Nicknames/Slogans ====
- "Super, Natural British Columbia" – dated provincial slogan, formerly seen on licence plates.

==== Unofficial Nicknames/Slogans ====
- "The Left Coast" – a name shared with the West Coast of the United States, referring to the region notably leaning politically left.
- "British California" – a play on the initials of the province, referring to its similarities with California in terms of culture, geography (particularly in the Lower Mainland), politics, and demographics.
- "Bring Cash" – a play on the initials of the province, referring to the high cost of living.

=== Manitoba ===
==== Official Nicknames/Slogans ====
- "The Keystone Province" – due to its position in the centre of Canada.
- "Canada's Heart is Calling" – Travel Manitoba's current slogan since January 2023.
- "Friendly Manitoba" – currently used on its licence plates.

==== Former Nicknames/Slogans ====
- "The Postage Stamp Province" – in its original form upon joining Confederation, Manitoba's size and shape resembled a postage stamp when viewing a map of Canada. The name faded after the province's boundaries were extended in 1881 and 1912.
- "The Land of 100,000 Lakes" – dated provincial slogan, formerly used in tourism campaigns; also formerly used on its licence plates from 1971 to 1975.
- "Canada's Heart Beats" – Travel Manitoba's slogan since 2014.

==== Unofficial Nicknames/Slogans ====
- "Manisnowba" – a portmanteau of Manitoba and snow because of how snowy the province can get.
- "The 204" – referring to the province's original area code.
- "Toba" – unofficial name used by several organizations.

=== Ontario ===
==== Official Nicknames/Slogans ====
- "The Heartland Province"
- "The Loyalist Province" – referring to Upper Canada (what is now Ontario) being one of the main destinations for Loyalists fleeing the United States during the American Revolution.
- "Yours to Discover" (French: À vous de Découvrir) – used on licence plates issued since 1982.
- "Open for Business" – as written on the "Welcome to Ontario" sign.

==== Former Nicknames/Slogans ====
- "The Province of Opportunity" – dated, official provincial slogan, formerly seen on provincial highway construction project signs.
- "A Place to Stand" – after the eponymous 1967 film made for the provincial pavilion at Expo 67, later used for the unofficial provincial anthem.
- "A Place to Grow" (French: En plein essor) – briefly used on licence plates in 2020, originally from the unofficial provincial anthem.

==== Unofficial Nicknames/Slogans ====
- "Onterrible" – derived from former residents of Ontario, as well as residents of other provinces.

=== New Brunswick ===
==== Former Nicknames/Slogans ====
- "The Picture Province" – formerly used on its licence plates.

==== Unofficial Nicknames/Slogans ====
- "Petit Québec" ("Little Quebec")
- Irvingland
- The drive through province

=== Newfoundland and Labrador ===
==== Official Nicknames/Slogans ====
- "The Big Land" (Labrador)
- "The Rock"

==== Former Nicknames/Slogans ====
- "Canada's Happy Province" – formerly used on its licence plates from 1968 to 1974.
- "A World of Difference" – formerly used on its licence plates from 1993 to 2001.

=== Nova Scotia ===
==== Official Nicknames/Slogans ====
- "The Bluenose Province"
- "The Sea Bound Coast"
- "Canada's Ocean Playground" – currently used on its licence plates.
- "Land of the Mi'kmaq" (Miꞌkmaꞌki region) – referring to current-day Nova Scotia belonging to the Miꞌkmaꞌki region, the traditional land of the Miꞌkmaq; currently used on specialty licence plates.

=== Prince Edward Island ===
==== Official Nicknames/Slogans ====
- "Birthplace of Confederation" (French: Berceau de la Confédération) – currently used on its licence plates since 2013 (and formerly 1997 to 2007).
- "Garden of the Gulf" – referring to the Gulf of St. Lawrence; formerly used on its licence plates from 1929–1930 and from 1962–1965. This nickname is still used in tourism boards and tourism campaigns.
- "P.E.I."

==== Former Nicknames/Slogans ====
- "The Garden Province" or "Canada's Green Province" (French: La province verte du Canada) – the former was used on its licence plates from 1966 to 1972; the latter was used from 2007 to 2012.
- "Home of Anne of Green Gables" – formerly used on its licence plates from 1993 to 1997; refers to the fictional rural hometown of the titular character in famous novel Anne of Green Gables.
- "The Cradle of Confederation"

==== Unofficial Nicknames/Slogans ====
- "Spud Island" – due to the province's status as a significant producer of potatoes.

=== Québec ===
==== Official Nicknames/Slogans ====
- "La Belle Province" ("The Beautiful Province") – formerly used on licence plates from 1963 to 1977.
- "Je me souviens" ("I Remember") – official motto of Quebec; currently used on its licence plates.

==== Former Nicknames/Slogans ====
- "La Province des Fêtes" ("The Province of Festivals" or "The Festival Province")
- "Je suis là" ("I'm here") – formerly used on licence plates.

=== Saskatchewan ===
==== Official Nicknames/Slogans ====
- "The Breadbasket of Canada"
- "The Land of the Living Skies" – currently used on its licence plates.

==== Former Nicknames/Slogans ====
- "The Wheat Province" – formerly used on its licence plates from 1951 to 1959.

==== Unofficial Nicknames/Slogans ====
- "The Drive-Through Province" – used sarcastically by Canadians, describing it as a boring province to visit.

== Territories ==
Names used for Northern Canada more broadly or shared between the three Canadian territories:

- "Canada's Arctic" or "The Canadian Arctic"
- "Canada's Last Frontier"
- "The Land of the Midnight Sun"

=== Northwest Territories ===
==== Official Nicknames/Slogans ====
- "North of Sixty" – referring to the territory's position above the 60th parallel.
- "Spectacular Northwest Territories" – currently used on its licence plates.
- "Land of the Polar Bear"

==== Former Nicknames/Slogans ====
- "Canada's Northland" – formerly used on its licence plates from 1954 to 1969.

=== Nunavut ===
==== Official Nicknames/Slogans ====
- "Our Land" – a simple translation of the Inuktitut word Nunavut.

=== Yukon ===
==== Official Nicknames/Slogans ====
- "The Klondike" – currently used on its licence plates.
- "Larger Than Life"

==== Former Nicknames/Slogans ====
- "Home of the Klondike" – used on its licence plates from 1971 to 1977.
- "Land of the Midnight Sun" – used on its licence plates from 1952 to 1970.

== See also ==
- List of city nicknames and slogans in Canada
- List of U.S. state nicknames
- Lists of nicknames – nickname list articles on Wikipedia
