= Vehicle registration plates of Prince Edward Island =

Prince Edward Island
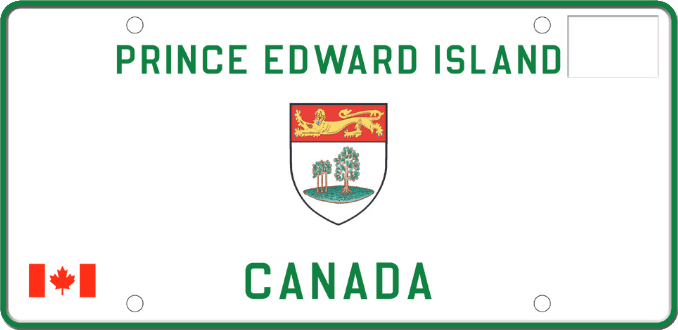
- Default version with provincial stile at top centre in English; identical version with provincial stile in French at top centre is available as an alternate design geared towards Francophones.

Current series
- Size: 12 in × 6 in 30 cm × 15 cm
- Serial format: 123★ABC
- Introduced: December 2022

Availability
- Issued by: PEI Department of Transportation and Infrastructure

History
- First issued: 1913

The Canadian province of Prince Edward Island first required its residents to register their motor vehicles and display licence plates in 1913; only rear licence plates have been required since 1976.

== Passenger baseplates ==
=== 1919 to 1961 ===
In 1956, Canada, the United States and Mexico came to an agreement with the American Association of Motor Vehicle Administrators, the Automobile Manufacturers Association and the National Safety Council that standardised the size for licence plates for motor vehicles (except those for motorcycles) at 6 inches (15 cm) in height by 12 inches (30 cm) in width, with standardized mounting holes. The first Prince Edward Island licence plate that complied with these standards was issued six years beforehand, in 1950.

Image	Dates issued	Description	Slogan	Serial format	Serials issued	Notes
	1919	Dark blue serial on light blue porcelain plate; vertical "PEI" at right	none	1234	1 to approximately 1000	
	1920	Embossed white serial on green plate with border line; vertical "PEI" at right	none	1234	1001 to approximately 2500	First embossed plate.
	1921	Embossed black serial on white plate with border line; vertical "PEI" at right	none	1-234	3-001 to approximately 4-800	
	1922	Embossed orange serial on black plate with border line; vertical "PEI" at right	none	1-234	5-001 to approximately 7-200	
	1923	Embossed white serial on black plate with border line; "P.E.I. 1923" at left	none	1-234	1-001 to approximately 3-300	First dated plate.
	1924	Embossed black serial on light green plate with border line; "P.E.I. 1924" at left	none	1-234	4-001 to approximately 6-500	
	1925	Embossed red serial on white plate with border line; vertical "P.E.I." and "1925" at left and right respectively	none	1-234	5-001 to approximately 7-900	
	1926	Embossed white serial on red plate with border line; "P.E. ISLAND" at bottom and vertical "1926" at right	none	1-234	5-001 to approximately 8-300	
	1927	Embossed orange serial on dark blue plate with border line; "PRINCE EDWARD ISLAND" at left and "CANADA 1927" at bottom	none	1-234	1-001 to approximately 5-300	First use of the full province name.
	1928	Embossed white serial on green plate with border line; "PRINCE EDWARD ISLAND" at bottom and vertical "1928" at right	"SEED POTATOES FOXES" at left	1-234	4-001 to approximately 8-800	
	1929	Embossed orange serial on black plate with border line; "PRINCE EDWARD ISLAND" at bottom and vertical "1929" at right	"GARDEN OF THE GULF" at left	1-234	1-001 to approximately 6-500	
	1930	Embossed green serial on white plate with border line; "PRINCE EDWARD ISLAND" at bottom and vertical "1930" at right	"GARDEN OF THE GULF" at left	1-234	3-001 to approximately 9-500	
	1931	Embossed white serial on maroon plate with border line; "PRINCE EDWARD ISLAND" at bottom and vertical "31" at right	none	1-234	1-001 to approximately 7-600	
	1932	Embossed white serial on green plate with border line; "PRINCE EDWARD ISLAND" at bottom and vertical "32" at right	none	1-234	1-001 to approximately 8-100	
	1933	Embossed white serial on purple plate with border line; "PRINCE EDWARD ISLAND" at bottom and vertical "1933" at right	none	1-234	1-001 to approximately 7-200	
	1934	Embossed orange serial on black plate with border line; "PRINCE EDWARD ISLAND" at bottom and vertical "1934" at right	none	1-234	1-001 to approximately 7-100	
	1935	Embossed black serial on orange plate; "PRINCE EDWARD ISLAND" at top and vertical "1935" at right	none	1-234	1-001 to approximately 7-300	
	1936	Embossed white serial on black plate; "PRINCE EDWARD ISLAND" at bottom and vertical "1936" at right	none	1-234	1-001 to approximately 7-100	
	1937	Embossed black serial on white plate; "PRINCE EDWARD ISLAND" at top and vertical "1937" at right	none	1-234	1-001 to approximately 8-000	
	1938	Embossed silver serial on dark green plate; "PRINCE EDWARD ISLAND" at top; provincial shield and "1938" at left	none	1-234	1-001 to approximately 7-700	
	1939	Embossed green serial on grey plate; "PRINCE EDWARD ISLAND" at bottom; "1939" and provincial shield at left	none	1-234	1-001 to approximately 7-800	
	1940	Embossed white serial on black plate; "PRINCE EDWARD ISLAND" at top; provincial shield and "1940" at left	none	1-234	1-001 to approximately 8-000	
	1941	Embossed black serial on orange plate; "PRINCE EDWARD ISLAND" at bottom; "1941" and provincial shield at left	none	1-234	1-001 to approximately 7-800	
	1942	Embossed silver serial on green plate; "PRINCE EDWARD ISLAND" at top; provincial shield and "1942" at left	none	1-234	1-001 to approximately 7-100	
	1943–44	Embossed white serial on black plate; "PRINCE EDWARD ISLAND" at bottom; "1943" and provincial shield at left	none	1-234	1-001 to approximately 7-900	Revalidated for 1944 with windshield stickers, due to metal conservation for World War II.
	1945	Embossed black serial on yellow plate; "PRINCE EDWARD ISLAND" at bottom; "1945" and provincial shield at left	none	1-234	1-001 to approximately 7-900	
	1946	Embossed yellow serial on black plate; "PRINCE EDWARD ISLAND" at top; provincial shield and "1946" at left	none	1-234	1-001 to approximately 8-400	
	1947	Embossed white serial on black plate; "PRINCE EDWARD ISLAND" at bottom; provincial shield and "1947" at right	none	1-234	1-001 to approximately 8-400	
	1948	Embossed black serial on silver plate; "PRINCE EDWARD ISLAND" at bottom; provincial shield and "1948" at left	none	1-234	1-001 to approximately 9-300	
	1949	Embossed white serial on blue plate with border line; "PRINCE EDWARD ISLAND" at bottom; provincial shield and "1949" at left	none	1-234	1-001 to approximately 9-999	
	1950	Embossed blue serial on white plate with border line; "PRINCE EDWARD ISLAND" at bottom; provincial shield and "1950" at left	none	1-234; 12345	1-001 to approximately 11500	First 6" x 12" plate.
	1951	Embossed white serial on dark blue plate with border line; provincial shield and "1951" used as separator; "PRINCE EDWARD ISLAND" at bottom	none	12-345	10-001 to approximately 22-000	
	1952	Embossed white serial on dark green plate with border line; provincial shield and "1952" used as separator; "PRINCE EDWARD ISLAND" at bottom	none	12-345	10-001 to approximately 21-100	
	1953	Embossed blue serial on yellow plate with border line; provincial shield and "1953" used as separator; "PRINCE EDWARD ISLAND" at bottom	none	12-345	10-001 to approximately 22-400	
	1954	Embossed yellow serial on blue plate with border line; provincial shield and "1954" used as separator; "PRINCE EDWARD ISLAND" at bottom	none	12-345	10-001 to approximately 22-900	
	1955	Embossed green serial on white plate with border line; provincial shield and "1955" used as separator; "PRINCE EDWARD ISLAND" at top	none	12-345	10-001 to approximately 23-400	
	1956	Embossed black serial on golden yellow plate with border line; provincial shield and "1956" used as separator; "PRINCE EDWARD ISLAND" at bottom	none	12-345	10-001 to approximately 24-500	
	1957	Embossed yellow serial on blue plate with border line; provincial shield and "1957" used as separator; "PRINCE EDWARD ISLAND" at top	none	12-345	10-001 to approximately 25-100	
	1958	Embossed red serial on white plate with border line; "1958" and provincial shield used as separator; "PRINCE EDWARD ISLAND" at bottom	none	12-345	10-001 to approximately 25-600	
	1959	Embossed silver serial on light blue plate with border line; provincial shield and "1959" used as separator; "PRINCE EDWARD ISLAND" at top	none	12-345	10-001 to approximately 27-100	
	1960	Embossed white serial on maroon plate with border line; "1960" and provincial shield used as separator; "PRINCE EDWARD ISLAND" at bottom	none	12-345	10-001 to approximately 30-500	
	1961	Embossed burnt orange serial on white plate with border line; provincial shield and "1961" used as separator; "PRINCE EDWARD ISLAND" at top	none	12-345	10-001 to approximately 30-300	

=== 1962 to present ===
Image	Dates issued	Description	Slogan	Serial format	Serials issued	Notes
	1962–63	Embossed white serial on dark blue plate with border line; "PRINCE EDWARD ISLAND" at top; white box at right containing debossed "62"	"GARDEN OF THE GULF" at bottom	12-345	20-001 to approximately 47-000	Revalidated for 1963 with stickers.
	1964–65	Embossed dark blue serial on white plate with border line; "PRINCE EDWARD ISLAND" at top; "64" at right	"GARDEN OF THE GULF" at bottom	12-345	20-001 to approximately 51-000	Revalidated for 1965 with yellow tabs.
	1966–68	Embossed white serial on dark green plate; border lines around plate and around top corners; "PRINCE EDWARD ISLAND" at bottom; "66" at top left	"GARDEN PROVINCE" centred at top	12-345	20-001 to approximately 61-000	Revalidated for 1967 and 1968 with stickers.
	1969–72	Embossed dark blue serial on reflective orange plate; border lines around plate and around top corners; "PRINCE EDWARD ISLAND" at bottom; "69" at top left	"GARDEN PROVINCE" centred at top	12-345	30-001 to 30-500	Reflective plates were experimental. All plates revalidated for 1970, 1971 and 1972 with stickers.
	1969–72	As above, but beige rather than orange, and non-reflective	"GARDEN PROVINCE" centred at top	12-345	30-501 to approximately 83-000	Reflective plates were experimental. All plates revalidated for 1970, 1971 and 1972 with stickers.
	1973–75	Embossed burnt orange serial on white plate with border line; Father of Confederation graphic at left; "PRINCE EDWARD ISLAND" at bottom	"The Place To Be... In 73" at top	12-345	19-760 to approximately 76-000	Awarded "Plate of the Year" for best new licence plate of 1973 by the Automobile License Plate Collectors Association, the first and, to date, only time Prince Edward Island has been so honoured. Revalidated for 1974 and 1975 with stickers.
	1976–80	Embossed white serial on dark blue plate with border line; "PRINCE EDWARD ISLAND" at bottom; white box at right containing debossed "76"	"SEAT BELTS SAVE" centred at top	12-345	19-790 to 99-999; 10-001 to approximately 12-000	Revalidated for 1977, 1978, 1979 and 1980 with stickers.
	1981–92	Embossed green serial with provincial shield separator on reflective white plate; border lines around plate and around bottom corners; "PRINCE EDWARD ISLAND" at top and "CANADA" centred at bottom	none	ABC★123	see right	Only A through T (excluding Q and S) used as first letter in serial, and only A through G (excluding D) used as second letter. Series with A as the second letter issued first; random order thereafter.
	1993–97	Embossed red serial on reflective white plate; green and red Anne of Green Gables graphic slightly to left of centre; "PRINCE EDWARD ISLAND" screened in red at top	"Home of "Anne of Green Gables"" screened in red centred at bottom	AB★123; Q1★234; QB★C12	Coded by county of issuance (A)	'K' code used in Kings County, 'P' in Prince County, and 'Q' in Queens County, which used the Q1 234 and QB C12 serial formats following QZ 999.
	1997			AB 123	AA 001 to approximately AH 500	No county coding.
	1997–2007	Embossed green serial on reflective gradient green, white and blue plate; screened Confederation Bridge graphic separator at top centre and national flag at bottom left; "Prince Edward Island" screened in green below graphic with green trees, wavy blue underline, and "CANADA" below underline	"Confederation Bridge" screened in green at top	AB★123	ZA 001 to approximately RV 999 (see right)	Progression of first letter was as follows: Z, Y, X, V (most series), U, R.
	1997–2007	As above, but with screened Province House graphic separator at top centre	"Birthplace of Confederation" screened in green at top	AB★123	WA 001 to approximately VW 999 (see right)	Issued concurrently with the Confederation Bridge base. Progression of first letter was as follows: W, N, V (some series).
	2007–09	Embossed green numbers on reflective white plate with screened photo of windmills	"Canada's Green Province" at bottom	AB 123	AA 101 to ZZ 999	Issued concurrently with "Canada's Green Province" base (website: "www.peiplay.ca")
	2010–12	Embossed green numbers on reflective white plate with screened photo of windmills	"Canada's Green Province" as 2007 base	123 AB	101 AA to 963 EW (As of July 30th 2011)	Issued concurrently with "Canada's Green Province" base (website: "www.peiplay.ca")
	2007–2012	Embossed green numbers on reflective white plate with screened photo of windmills	La province verte du Canada as 2007 base	JA123	JA101 to JA999	Issued concurrently with "La province verte du Canada" base (website: "www.douceurdelile.com")
	2013–2022	Embossed light brown numbers on reflective white with screened facsimile of Province House on the left, provincial coat of arms in centre.	Birthplace of Confederation	12★3AB A1★23B	10 1AA to 99 9ZZ A1 01A to C7 56G (As of July 30th 2022)	
	2013–2022	Embossed light brown numbers on reflective white with screened facsimile of Province House on the left, provincial coat of arms in centre.	Berceau de la Confederation	12★3AB A1★23B	10 1AA to 99 9ZZ A1 01A to C7 56G (As of July 30th 2022)	
	2013–present	Personalized plates; can choose to have Province House on the left.	Birthplace of Confederation	unlimited		Any personalized plates are allowed so long as text is not offensive; can also be low digit.
	2022–present	Green letters on white baseplate; 'PRINCE EDWARD ISLAND' screened at top. Provincial crest separator in centre and small Canadian state flag in bottom left.	CANADA	123★ABC		Default version for Anglophone Prince Edward Islanders.
	2022–present	Green letters on white baseplate; 'ÎLE-DU-PRINCE-ÉDOUARD' screened at top. Provincial crest separator in centre and small Canadian state flag in bottom left.	CANADA	123★ABC		Available as an alternate choice for Francophone Prince Edward Islanders.

== Commercial licence plates ==
Image	Type	Dates issued	Description	Slogan	Serial format	Serials issued	Notes
	Commercial	1997–2007	Embossed green serial on reflective gradient green, white and blue plate; screened Confederation Bridge graphic at top centre and national flag at bottom left; "Prince Edward Island" screened in green below graphic with green trees, wavy blue underline, and "CANADA" below underline	"Confederation Bridge" screened in green at top	CA 123		
	Commercial	2007–2012	Embossed green numbers on reflective white plate with screened photo of windmills	"Canada's Green Province" at bottom	CA 123		
	Commercial	2013–present	Embossed light brown numbers on reflective white with photo of Province House on the left	Birthplace of Confederation	CVC1 234		Letters CV are stacked on left
	PRP	1997–2007	Embossed green serial on reflective gradient green, white and blue plate; screened Confederation Bridge graphic at top centre and national flag at bottom left; "Prince Edward Island" screened in green below graphic with green trees, wavy blue underline, and "CANADA" below underline	"Confederation Bridge" screened in green at top	P1 234		
	PRP	2007–2012	Embossed green numbers on reflective white plate with screened photo of windmills	"Canada's Green Province" at bottom	P1 234		
	PRP	2013–present	Embossed light brown numbers on reflective white with photo of Province House on the left	Birthplace of Confederation	P1 234		

== Non-passenger plates ==
Image	Type	Dates issued	Description	Slogan	Serial format	Serials issued	Notes
	Dealer		Embossed red serial on reflective yellow plate; "Prince Edward Island" at top, and "Dealer" at bottom	none	DLR1234		
	Service Vehicle	1997–2007	Embossed green serial on reflective gradient green, white and blue plate; screened Confederation Bridge graphic at top centre and national flag at bottom left; "Prince Edward Island" screened in green below graphic with green trees, wavy blue underline, and "CANADA" below underline	"Confederation Bridge" screened in green at top	SV★A12		
	Service Vehicle	2007–2012	Embossed green numbers on reflective white plate with screened photo of windmills	"Canada's Green Province" at bottom	SV★A12		
	Service Vehicle	2013–present	Embossed light brown numbers on reflective white with photo of Province House on the left	Birthplace of Confederation	SV12 345		Letters SV are stacked on left
	Trailer	1993–1997	Embossed red serial on reflective white plate; green and red Anne of Green Gables graphic slightly to left of centre; "PRINCE EDWARD ISLAND" screened in red at top	"Home of "Anne of Green Gables"" screened in red centred at bottom	TA★123		
	Trailer	1997-–2007	Embossed green serial on reflective gradient green, white and blue plate; screened Confederation Bridge graphic at top centre and national flag at bottom left; "Prince Edward Island" screened in green below graphic with green trees, wavy blue underline, and "CANADA" below underline	"Confederation Bridge" screened in green at top	12★3AT		
	Trailer	2007–2012	Embossed green numbers on reflective white plate with screened photo of windmills	"Canada's Green Province" at bottom	12★3AT		
	Trailer	2013–present	Embossed light brown numbers on reflective white with photo of Province House on the left	Birthplace of Confederation	TLR12T34		
	Motorcycle	1993–1997	Embossed red serial on reflective white plate; green and red Anne of Green Gables graphic slightly to left of centre; "PRINCE EDWARD ISLAND" screened in red at top	"Home of "Anne of Green Gables"" screened in red centred at bottom			
	Motorcycle	1997–2007	Embossed green serial on reflective gradient green, white and blue plate; screened Confederation Bridge graphic at top centre and national flag at bottom left; "Prince Edward Island" screened in green below graphic with green trees, wavy blue underline, and "CANADA" below underline	"Confederation Bridge" screened in green at top	A1★23		
	Motorcycle	2007–2012	Embossed green numbers on reflective white plate with screened photo of windmills	"Canada's Green Province" at bottom			
	Motorcycle	2013–present	Embossed light brown numbers on reflective white with photo of Province House on the left	Birthplace of Confederation			

== Specialty licence plates ==
Image	Type	Dates issued	Description	Slogan	Serial format	Serials issued	Notes
	Volunteer firefighter	1993–1997	Embossed red serial on reflective white plate; green and red Anne of Green Gables graphic slightly to left of centre; "PRINCE EDWARD ISLAND" screened in red at top	"Home of "Anne of Green Gables"" screened in red centred at bottom	A12		
	Volunteer firefighter	1997–2007	Embossed green serial on reflective gradient green, white and blue plate; screened Confederation Bridge graphic at top centre and national flag at bottom left; "Prince Edward Island" screened in green below graphic with green trees, wavy blue underline, and "CANADA" below underline	"Confederation Bridge" screened in green at top	1A1		
	Volunteer firefighter	2007–2012	Embossed green numbers on reflective white plate with screened photo of windmills	"Canada's Green Province" at bottom	1A1		
	Volunteer firefighter	2013–present	Embossed light brown numbers on reflective white with photo of Province House on the left	Birthplace of Confederation	12 3FA		FD to FS
	Green electric vehicle (English)	2022–present	White serial on green background, provincial escutcheon in centre and state flag at bottom left.	ELECTRIC VEHICLE	123★4EV		
	Green electric vehicle (French)	2022–present	White serial on green background, provincial escutcheon in centre and state flag at bottom left.	VÉHICULE ÉLECTRIQUE	123★4EV		

=== Conservation licence plates ===
In 2013, the province introduced five new specialty plate designs. Those designs included; Blue jay, Canada goose, Red fox, Trout & Lady slipper, the provinces official flower. All profits go to the P.E.I. Wildlife Conservation Fund.

Image	Type	Dates issued	Description	Slogan	Serial format	Serials issued	Notes
	Blue Jay	2013	Embossed light brown numbers on reflective white with photo of Province House on the left; Blue Jay graphic on right	Birthplace of Confederation			
License plate from PEI feat. Canada Goose	Goose	2013	Embossed light brown numbers on reflective white with photo of Province House on the left; Goose graphic on right	Birthplace of Confederation			
	Red fox	2013	Embossed light brown numbers on reflective white with photo of Province House on the left; Red fox graphic on right	Birthplace of Confederation			
	Lady slipper	2013	Embossed light brown numbers on reflective white with photo of Province House on the left; Lady slipper flower graphic on right	Birthplace of Confederation			
	Speckled trout	2013	Embossed light brown numbers on reflective white with photo of Province House on the left; Trout graphic on right	Birthplace of Confederation			
