= Vehicle registration plates of the Northwest Territories =

The Northwest Territories
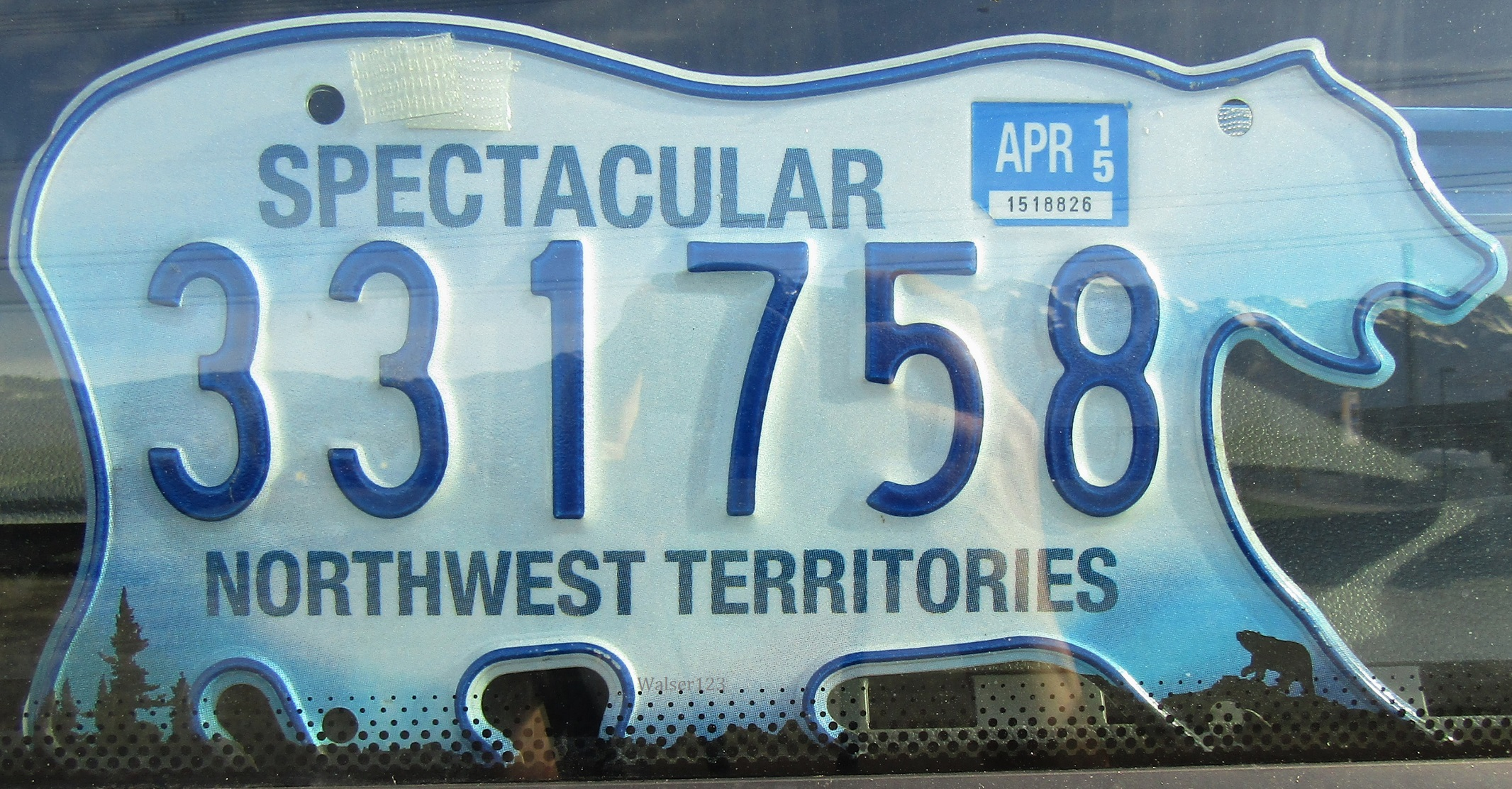

Current series
- Slogan: Spectacular Northwest Territories
- Material: Aluminum
- Serial format: 123456
- Introduced: July 1, 2010

Availability
- Issued by: Registrar of Motor Vehicles, Government of the Northwest Territories

History
- First issued: 1941

The Canadian territory of Northwest Territories first required its residents to register their motor vehicles and display licence plates in 1941. As of 2022, plates are issued by the Northwest Territories Registrar of Motor Vehicles. Only rear plates have been required since June 1, 1993 and have been required thereafter.

In 1970, to celebrate the centennial of the territory, a unique polar bear-shaped plate was introduced. The basic bear shape has been retained ever since, and the plate is now a registered trademark of the Government of the Northwest Territories.

The current design, which consists of graphic and material updates, was rolled out on July 1, 2010. The blue-and-white plates prior to the update were made of steel and lack graphic sheeting technology that would make them visible in the dark. Current plates are made with aluminum and incorporated visual updates as well as a new slogan.

== Influence on Nunavut plate design ==
In April 1999, the territory of Nunavut was created from the eastern part of the Northwest Territories. The new territory adopted a virtually identical bear-shaped licence plate, following an agreement between the governments of the two territories. In 2011, the Government of Nunavut decided to discontinue the bear shape and replace it with a conventional rectangular design, which was introduced in July 2012.

In 2024, the polar bear plate was reintroduced and, as of summer 2025, is required for all motor vehicles.

== Passenger baseplates ==
=== 1945 to 1974 ===
In 1956, Canada, the United States, and Mexico came to an agreement with the American Association of Motor Vehicle Administrators, the Automobile Manufacturers Association and the National Safety Council that standardized the size for licence plates for vehicles (except those for motorcycles) at 6 inches (15 cm) in height by 12 inches (30 cm) in width, with standardized mounting holes. The first Northwest Territories licence plate that complied with these standards was issued five years beforehand, in 1951. The current bear-shaped plates feature the standard mounting holes.

Image	Dates issued	Design	Slogan	Serial format	Serials issued	Notes
27	1945	White on blue	none	123	1 to approximately 180	
37	1946	Orange on black	none	123	1 to approximately 290	
277	1947	Black on silver	none	123	1 to approximately 400	
38	1948	White on blue	none	123	1 to approximately 590	
72	1949	White on green	none	123	1 to approximately 460	
727	1950	Black on orange	none	1234	651 to approximately 1350	
1722	1951	Orange on black	none	1234	1351 to approximately 2100	First 6" x 12" plate.
138	1952	White on blue	none	123	100 to approximately 650	
76	1953	Black on orange	none	123	100 to approximately 760	
378	1954	Orange on black	Canada's Northland	123	100 to approximately 870	
723	1955	Black on orange	Canada's Northland	123	100 to approximately 1300	
273	1956	Orange on black	Canada's Northland	1234	100 to approximately 1100	
762	1957	Black on orange	Canada's Northland	1234	100 to approximately 1400	
237	1958	Orange on black	Canada's Northland	1234	100 to approximately 2200	
27	1959	Black on orange	Canada's Northland	1234	100 to approximately 2300	
763	1960	Orange on black	Canada's Northland	1234	100 to approximately 2400	
	1961	Black on orange	Canada's Northland	1234	100 to approximately 3400	
	1962	Orange on black	Canada's Northland	1234	100 to approximately 4100	
287	1963	Black on orange	Canada's Northland	1234	100 to approximately 3900	
723	1964	Orange on black	Canada's Northland	1234	100 to approximately 4200	
	1965	White on light green	Canada's Northland	1-234	100 to approximately 4-900	
	1966–69	Black on reflective orange; territorial shield at left	Canada's Northland	12-345	100 to approximately 11-500	Revalidated for 1967 with white-on-blue tabs, for 1968 with red-on-white tabs, and for 1969 with green-on-white tabs.
	1970	Bear-shaped; white on blue	Centennial	1-234	1 to approximately 7-500	First bear-shaped plate. Awarded inaugural "Plate of the Year" for best new licence plate of 1970 by the Automobile License Plate Collectors Association.
	1971	Bear-shaped; blue on white	none	1-234	1 to approximately 8-500	
	1972	Bear-shaped; white on blue	none	12-345	1 to approximately 10-500	
	1973	Bear-shaped; dark blue on white with yellow slogan, date, and border	RCMP Centennial	12-345	1 to approximately 11-000	
	1974	Bear-shaped; red on white	none	12-345	1 to approximately 11-500	

=== 1975 to present ===
Image	Dates issued	Design	Slogan	Serial format	Serials issued	Notes
	1975–76	Bear-shaped; turquoise on white	none	12-345	1 to approximately 18-000	Revalidated for 1976 with stickers.
	1977–78	Bear-shaped; red on white	none	12-345	1 to approximately 21-500	Revalidated for 1978 with stickers.
	1979–80	Bear-shaped; turquoise on white	none	12-345	1 to approximately 21-500	Revalidated for 1980 with stickers.
	1981–82	Bear-shaped; red on white	none	12-345	1 to approximately 21-000	Revalidated for 1982 with stickers.
	1983–85	Bear-shaped; blue on white	none	12-345	1 to approximately 30-500	Last dated plate. Revalidated for 1984 and 1985 with stickers.
	1986–2010	Bear-shaped; blue on white	Explore Canada's Arctic	123456	1 to approximately 126000	Monthly staggered registration introduced 1990. Front and rear plates issued through May 31, 1993 (serials 1 through 51700); only rear plates issued thereafter.
	2010–present	Bear-shaped; nature scene	Spectacular	123456	300000 to 378949 (as of November 5, 2024)	

== Commercial plates ==
Image	First issued	Design	Serial format	Serials issued	Notes
	1967		CV1234		
	1968		CV123		
	1969		CV123		
	1970		CV1234		
	1971		CV123		
	1972		CV123		
	1973		CV1234		
	1974		CV123		
	1975-76		CV1234		
	1977-78		CV1234		
	1979-80		CV1234		
	1981-82		CV1234		
	1983-85		CV1234		
	1986		CV1234	CV100 to CV9999	
	1991	As 1986 passenger base	C12345	C10000 to approximately C29999	
	2010	As Spectacular passenger base	C12345	C30000 to C48571 (as of June 3, 2022)	

== Non-passenger plates ==
Image	Type	First issued	Design	Serial format	Serials issued	Notes
	Construction	2010	Bear-shaped; green on white; "CONSTRUCTION" at top, "NORTHWEST TERRITORIES" at bottom.	H12345	unknown to H11944 (as of June 7, 2025)	
	Dealer	2010	Bear-shaped; black on white; "DEALER" at top, "NORTHWEST TERRITORIES" at bottom.	D1234	unknown to D2323 (as of October 1, 2022)	
	Government	2010	As Spectacular passenger base	G12345	G8000 to G12291 (as of June 1, 2022)	
	Public Service	1986	Bear-shaped; blue on white; "EXPLORE CANADA'S ARTIC" at top, "NORTHWEST TERRITORIES" at bottom.	PS1234		Issued to taxis and busses.
	Public Service	2010	As Spectacular passenger base	P12345		
	Motorcycle	1986	Bear-shaped; blue on white; "NWT" at top	1234	100 to approximately 9999	
	Motorcycle	2010	Similar to Spectacular passenger base	12345	10000 to 13075 (as of May 14, 2022)	
	ATV / Off-road	1986				
	ATV / Off-road	2010	Bear-shaped; orange on white; "NWT" at top	12345		
	Trailer	1991		T12345	T40000 to present	
	Trailer	2010	As Spectacular passenger base	T12345	T40000 to present	

== Veteran plate ==
Image	First issued	Design	Serial format	Serials issued	Notes
	2010	Bear-shaped; red on white; poppy icon at very bottom, "LEST WE FORGET" at top and "NORTHWEST TERRITORIES" at bottom.	VET123	VET001 to VET512 (as of October 1, 2022)	
