= Vehicle registration plates of Yukon =

Yukon
Current series
- Slogan: The Klondike
- Size: 12 in × 6 in 30 cm × 15 cm
- Serial format: ABC12
- Introduced: 1990

History
- First issued: 1924

The Canadian territory of Yukon first required its residents to register their motor vehicles and display licence plates in 1914. Only rear plates have been required since 1990.

== Passenger baseplates ==
=== 1924 to 1979 ===
In 1956, Canada, the United States and Mexico came to an agreement with the American Association of Motor Vehicle Administrators, the Automobile Manufacturers Association and the National Safety Council that standardized the size for licence plates for vehicles (except those for motorcycles) at 6 inches (15 cm) in height by 12 inches (30 cm) in width, with standardized mounting holes. The 1954 (dated 1955) issue was the first Yukon licence plate that complied with these standards.

Image	First issued	Design	Slogan	Serial format	Serials issued	Notes
	1924	Black on yellow; "Y.T. 1924" at right	none	123	100 to approximately 210	
	1925	White on dark blue; "Y.T. 1925" at right	none	123	100 to approximately 230	
	1926	Black on red; "Y.T. 1926" at right	none	123	100 to approximately 240	
	1927	Black on yellow; "Y.T. 1927" at right	none	123	100 to approximately 300	
	1928	White on green; "Y.T. 1928" at right	none	123	100 to approximately 260	
	1929	White on dark blue; "Y.T. 1929" at right	none	123	100 to approximately 300	
	1930	Black on yellow; "Y.T. 1930" at right	none	123	100 to approximately 350	
	1931	Orange on black; "YUKON TY. 1931" at bottom	none	123	100 to approximately 450	
	1932	Black on orange; "YUKON TY. 1932" at bottom	none	123	100 to approximately 400	
	1933	White on green; "YUKON TY. 1933" at bottom	none	123	100 to approximately 400	
	1934	Black on light blue; black lines at top and bottom borders; "YUKON TY. 1934" at bottom	none	123	100 to approximately 400	
	1935	Dark blue on gray; dark blue lines at top and bottom borders; "YUKON TY. 1935" at bottom	none	123	100 to approximately 400	
	1936	Black on red; black lines at top and bottom borders; "YUKON TY. 1936" at bottom	none	123	100 to approximately 400	
	1937	White on maroon; white lines at top and bottom borders; "YUKON TY. 1937" at bottom	none	123	100 to approximately 450	
	1938	Orange on black; orange lines at top and bottom borders; "YUKON TY. 1938" at bottom	none	123	100 to approximately 450	
	1939	Black on yellow with border line; "YUKON TY. 1939" at bottom	none	123	100 to approximately 500	
	1940	White on green with border line; "YUKON TY. 1940" at bottom	none	123	100 to approximately 500	
	1941	White on black with border line; "YUKON TY. 1941" at bottom	none	123	100 to approximately 450	
	1942	Black on gray with border line; "YUKON TY. 1942" at bottom	none	123	100 to approximately 500	
	1943	Black on orange with border line; "YUKON TY. 1943" at bottom	none	123	100 to approximately 700	
	1944	Black on yellow with border line; "YUKON TY. 1944" at bottom	none	123	100 to approximately 750	
	1945	White on maroon with border line; "YUKON TY. 1945" at bottom	none	123	100 to approximately 650	
	1946	Black on light blue with border line; "YUKON TY. 1946" at bottom	none	1234	100 to approximately 1100	
	1947	White on green with border line; "YUKON TY. 1947" at bottom	none	1234	100 to approximately 1400	
	1948	Orange on black with border line; "YUKON TY. 1948" at bottom	none	1234	100 to approximately 1900	
	1949	Red on silver with border line; "YUKON TY. 1949" at bottom	none	1234	100 to approximately 2100	
	1950	Black on gray with border line; "YUKON TY. 1950" at bottom	none	1234	100 to approximately 1000	
	1951	Green on gray with border line; "YUKON TY.-EX. 31-3-52" at bottom	none	1234	100 to approximately 1100	
	1952	White on blue with border line; black embossed prospector at left with gold paint speck; "YUKON TY. CANADA" at bottom and "EX. 31-3-53" at right	Land of the Midnight Sun	1234	1 to approximately 2300	Revalidated through March 31, 1954 with blue tabs, then through March 31, 1955 with white tabs.
	1955	White on green with border line; black embossed prospector at left with gold paint speck; "YUKON 55" at bottom	Land of the Midnight Sun	1234	1 to approximately 2300	First 6" x 12" plate.
	1956	Dark blue on white with border line; black embossed prospector at left with gold paint speck; "YUKON 56" at bottom	Land of the Midnight Sun	1234	1 to approximately 2500	
	1957	Red on white with border line; black embossed prospector at left with gold paint speck; "YUKON 57" at bottom	Land of the Midnight Sun	1234	1 to approximately 2600	
	1958	White on red with border line; black embossed prospector at left with gold paint speck; "YUKON 58" at bottom	Land of the Midnight Sun	1234	1 to approximately 3200	Manufactured in British Columbia using that province's serial dies. This practice continued through 1977.
	1959	White on black with border line; red embossed prospector at left with gold paint speck; "YUKON 59" at bottom	Land of the Midnight Sun	1-234	1 to approximately 3-200	
	1960	Black on white with border line; red embossed prospector at left with gold paint speck; "YUKON 60" at bottom	Land of the Midnight Sun	1-234	1 to approximately 3-800	
	1961	Maroon on sky blue with border line; maroon embossed prospector at left with gold paint speck; "YUKON 61" at bottom	Land of the Midnight Sun	1-234	1 to approximately 4-000	
	1962	White on dark green with border line; red embossed prospector at left with gold paint speck; "YUKON 62" at bottom	Land of the Midnight Sun	1-234	1 to approximately 4-200	
	1963	Black on light yellow with border line; black embossed prospector at left with gold paint speck; "YUKON 63" at bottom	Land of the Midnight Sun	1-234	1 to approximately 4-500	
	1964	Red on white with border line; red embossed prospector at left with gold paint speck; "YUKON 64" at bottom	Land of the Midnight Sun	1234	1 to approximately 4800	
	1965	Green on white with border line; green embossed prospector at left with gold paint speck; "YUKON 65" at bottom	Land of the Midnight Sun	1234	1 to approximately 4300	
	1966	Red on white with border line; red embossed prospector at left with gold paint speck; "YUKON 66" at bottom	Land of the Midnight Sun	1234	1 to approximately 4900	
	1967	Blue on white with border line; blue embossed prospector at left with gold paint speck; "YUKON 67" at bottom	Land of the Midnight Sun	1234	1 to approximately 5200	
	1968	Black on white with border line; black embossed prospector at left with gold paint speck; "YUKON 68" at bottom	Land of the Midnight Sun	1234	1 to approximately 5800	
	1969	Black on light yellow with border line; black embossed prospector at left with gold paint speck; "YUKON 69" at bottom	Land of the Midnight Sun	1234	1 to approximately 6200	
	1970	Green on white with border line; green embossed prospector at left with gold paint speck; "YUKON 70" at bottom	Land of the Midnight Sun	1234	1 to approximately 7300	
	1971	Orange on white with border line; orange embossed prospector at left with gold paint speck; "YUKON 71" at bottom	Home of the Klondike	1234	1 to approximately 6300	
	1972	Green on white with border line; green embossed prospector at left with gold paint speck; "YUKON 72" at bottom	Home of the Klondike	1234	1 to approximately 6500	
	1973	Black on tan with border line; black embossed prospector at left with gold paint speck; "YUKON 73" at bottom	Home of the Klondike	1234	1 to approximately 7000	
	1974	Green on white with border line; green embossed prospector at left with gold paint speck; "YUKON 74" at bottom	Home of the Klondike	1234	1 to approximately 8000	
	1975	Orange on white with border line; orange embossed prospector at left with gold paint speck; "YUKON 75" at bottom	Home of the Klondike	1234	1 to approximately 8000	
	1976	Black on white with border line; black embossed prospector at left with gold paint speck; "YUKON 76" at bottom	Home of the Klondike	A123	Coded by region (A)	Letters A, B, C, E, J, K, L, N, P and T used in Whitehorse, D in Dawson, F in Faro, H in Haines Junction, M in Mayo, and W in Watson Lake. This continued through 1981.
	1977	Red on white with border line; red embossed prospector at left with gold paint speck; "YUKON 77" at bottom	Home of the Klondike	A123	Coded by region (A)	
	1978	Green on white with border line; green embossed prospector at left with gold paint speck; "YUKON" centred at bottom and "78" at top right	The Klondike	AB-12	Coded by region (A)	Manufactured in Saskatchewan using that province's serial dies. This practice continued until 1990.
	1979	Red on white with border line; red embossed prospector at left with gold paint speck; "YUKON" centred at bottom and "79" at top right	The Klondike	AB-12	Coded by region (A)	Final single-year passenger plate in Canada.

=== 1980 to present ===
Image	First issued	Design	Slogan	Serial format	Serials issued	Notes
	1980	Green on white with border line; green embossed prospector at left with gold paint speck; "YUKON" centred at bottom and "80" at top right	The Klondike	AB-12	Coded by region (A)	Revalidated for 1981 with stickers.
	1981	As above, but without "80"	The Klondike	AB-12	Coded by region (A)	Revalidated for 1981 with stickers.
	1982	Red on white with border line; red embossed prospector at left with gold paint speck; "YUKON" centred at bottom	The Klondike	ABC-1	ABA-1 to ?	
	1985	Black on reflective gold with border line; black embossed prospector at left; "YUKON" centred at bottom	The Klondike	ABC-1	ABA-1 to ?	
	1990	Black on reflective white with border line; screened prospector at left; screened red "Yukon" centred on sky blue band at bottom	The Klondike	ABC12; ABC 12	AAA01 to KAA04 (As of July 20, 2026)	Letters I, Q, U and Y not used in serials, and C, D, F and G not used as first letters.

== Non-passenger plates ==
Image	Type	First issued	Description	Serial format	Serials issued	Notes
	Commercial – Heavy	1990	As current passenger base; "Commercial" in place of slogan	CBC12	CAA01 to CKZ99	
	Commercial – Heavy	2009	As current passenger base; "Commercial" in place of slogan	CB123	CA001 to present	
	Commercial – Light	1990	As current passenger base	CBC12	CLA01 to CZZ99	
	Dealer	1990	As current passenger base, but without prospector; "Dealer" in place of slogan	DLR123	DLR001 to DLR999	
	Farm Vehicle	1990	As current passenger base, but without prospector; "Farm Vehicle" in place of slogan	F1234	F0001 to present	
	Federal Government	1990	As current passenger base	FGC12	FGA01 to present	
	Motorcycle	1990	Similar to current passenger base but without prospector; "Motorcycle" at top	M 12345	M 50001 to present	
	RCMP	1990	As current passenger base	MPC12	MPA01 to present	
	Rental Vehicle	1990	As current passenger base; "Rental" or slogan at top	RBC12	RAA01 to present	
	Snowmachine	1990	As Motorcycle plate, but with "Snowmachine" at top	S 12345	S 0001 to present	
	Territorial Government	1990	As current passenger base, but without prospector; "Government" in place of slogan	YTG123	YTG001 to YTG999	
	Territorial Government	2008	As above, but with prospector	Y1234	Y1000 to present	
	Other government	1990		G12 345	G00 001 to present	
	Trailer	1990	As Motorcycle plate, but with "Trailer" at top	T 12345	T 50001 to present	
