= Vehicle registration plates of Saskatchewan =

Saskatchewan
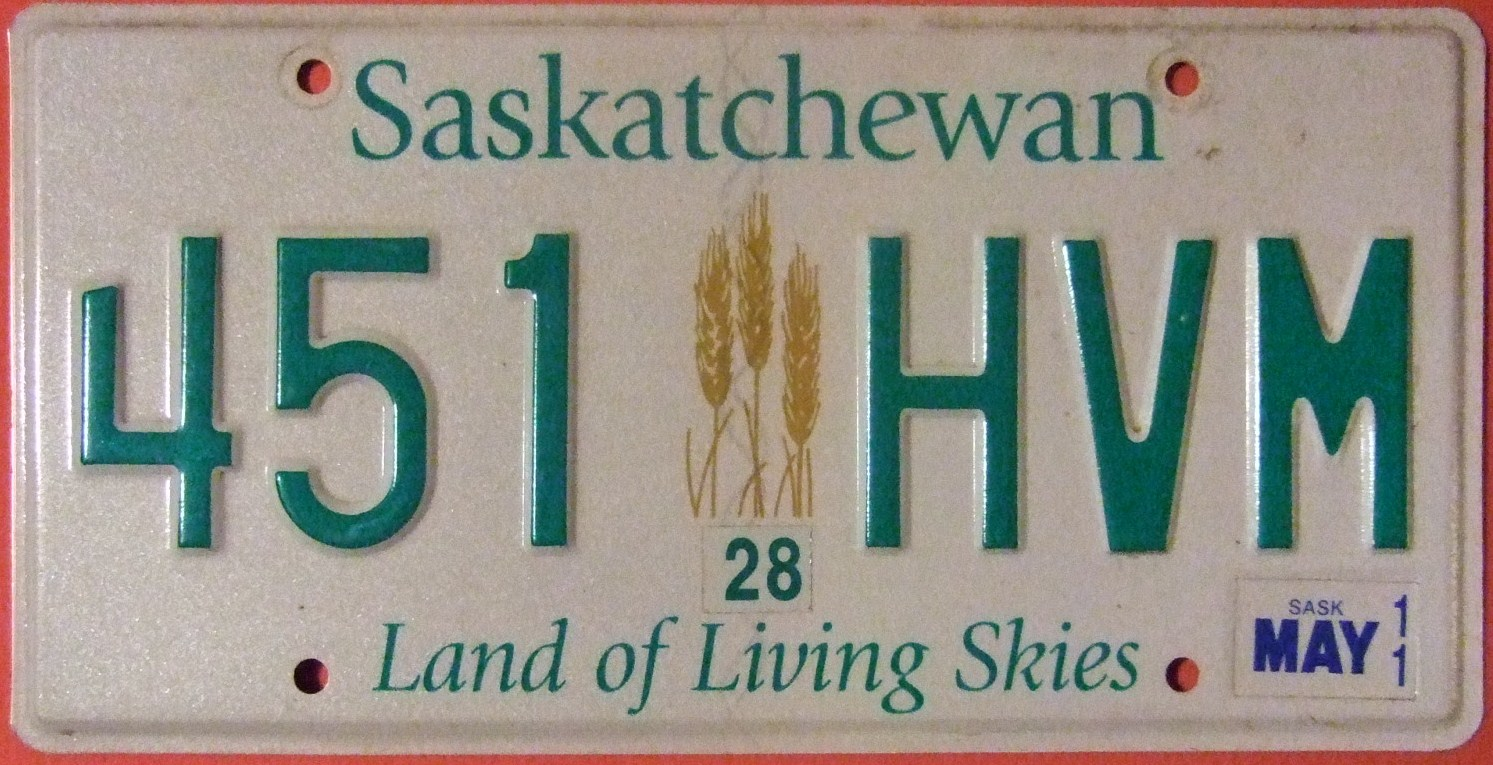

Current series
- Slogan: Land of Living Skies
- Size: 12 in × 6 in 30 cm × 15 cm
- Material: Aluminum
- Serial format: 123 ABC
- Introduced: 2009

Availability
- Issued by: Saskatchewan Government Insurance

History
- First issued: 1912

The Canadian province of Saskatchewan first required its residents to register their motor vehicles in 1906. Registrants provided their own licence plates for display until 1912, when the province began to issue plates.

As of 2026, plates are issued by Saskatchewan Government Insurance. Only rear plates have been required since June 30, 2004.

== Passenger baseplates ==
=== 1912 to 1976 ===
In 1956, Canada, the United States and Mexico came to an agreement with the American Association of Motor Vehicle Administrators, the Automobile Manufacturers Association and the National Safety Council that standardized the size for licence plates for vehicles (except those for motorcycles) at 6 inches (15 cm) in height by 12 inches (30 cm) in width, with standardized mounting holes. The 1954 (dated 1955) issue was the first Saskatchewan licence plate that complied with these standards.

| Image | Dates issued | Design | Slogan | Serial format | Serials issued | Notes |
|---|---|---|---|---|---|---|
| | 1912 | White on black porcelain; vertical "SASK" and "1912" at left and right respectively | none | 1234 | 1 to approximately 4500 | |
| | 1913 | Black on white porcelain; vertical "SASK" and "1913" at left and right respectively | none | 1234 | 1 to approximately 6500 | |
| | 1914 | Dark blue on yellow porcelain; vertical "SASK" and "1914" at left and right respectively | none | 1234 | 1 to approximately 9000 | |
| | 1915 | Black on orange flat metal; vertical "SASK" and "1915" at left and right respectively | none | 12345 | 1 to approximately 13500 | |
| | 1916 | Navy blue on ivory flat metal; vertical "SASK" and "1916" at left and right respectively | none | 12345 | 1 to approximately 18500 | |
| | 1917 | Red on white flat metal; vertical "SASK" and "1917" at left and right respectively | none | 12345 | 1 to approximately 33000 | |
| | 1918 | White on green flat metal; vertical "SASK" and "1918" at left and right respectively | none | 12345 | 1 to approximately 54000 | Some later plates embossed. |
| | 1919 | White on black porcelain; "SASK", provincial shield and "1919" at left | none | 12345 | 1 to approximately 60000 | Revalidated for 1920 with yellow tabs, for 1921 with red tabs, and for 1922 with green tabs. |
| | 1920 | As above, but without provincial shield and year | none | 12345 | 60001 to approximately 67000 | Validated in the same manner as for 1919 plates. |
| | 1921 | As above, but metal rather than porcelain | none | 12345 | 67001 to approximately 82000 | Validated in the same manner as for 1919 plates. |
| | 1922 | As above, but metal rather than porcelain | none | 12-345 | 82-001 to approximately 97-000 | Validated in the same manner as for 1919 plates. |
| | 1923 | Black on yellow; vertical "SASK" and "1923" at left and right respectively | none | 12-345 | 1 to approximately 62-000 | |
| | 1924 | White on dark blue; vertical "SASK" and "1924" at left and right respectively | none | 12-345 | 1 to approximately 65-000 | |
| | 1925 | Black on grey; vertical "SASK" and "1925" at left and right respectively | none | 12-345 | 1 to approximately 68-000 | |
| | 1926 | White on red; diagonal "SASK" and "1926" at left | none | 12-345 | 1 to approximately 87-000 | |
| | 1927 | White on black; "1927" and diagonal "SASK" at right | none | 12-345 | 1 to approximately 98-000 | |
| | 1928 | White on green; "1928" centred at top and "SASKATCHEWAN" at bottom | none | 123-456 | 1 to approximately 104-000 | First use of the full province name. |
| | 1929 | Black on golden yellow; "1929" centred at top with "SASKATCHEWAN" below | none | 123-456 | 1 to approximately 109-000 | |
| | 1930 | White on maroon; "SASKATCHEWAN" at top and "1930" centred at bottom | none | 123-456 | 1 to approximately 120-000 | |
| | 1931 | White on purple; "SASKATCHEWAN" at bottom and vertical "1931" at right | none | 12-345 | 1 to approximately 92-000 | |
| | 1932 | White on blue; vertical "1932" at left and "SASKATCHEWAN" at bottom | none | 12-345 | 1 to approximately 89-000 | |
| | 1933 | Black on golden yellow; "SASKATCHEWAN–33" at top | none | 12-345 | 1 to approximately 65-000 | |
| | 1934 | White on red; "34–SASKATCHEWAN" at bottom | none | 12-345 | 1 to approximately 75-000 | |
| | 1935 | White on brown; "35 SASKATCHEWAN" at top | none | 12-345 | 1 to approximately 77-000 | |
| | 1936 | Black on orange; "SASKATCHEWAN–36" at bottom | none | 12-345 | 1 to approximately 82-000 | |
| | 1937 | Black on white; "SASKATCHEWAN–37" at top | "CORONATION YEAR" at bottom | 12-345 | 1 to approximately 87-000 | Commemorated the coronation of King George VI. |
| | 1938 | White on red; "38–SASKATCHEWAN" at bottom | none | 12-345 | 1 to approximately 89-000 | |
| | 1939 | Black on orange; "39 SASKATCHEWAN" at top | none | 12-345 | 1 to approximately 92-000 | |
| | 1940 | Red on white; "SASKATCHEWAN-40" at bottom | none | 12-345 | 1 to approximately 95-000 | |
| | 1941 | White on red; "SASKATCHEWAN -41" at top | none | 12-345 | 1 to approximately 96-000 | |
| | 1942 | Black on orange; "42–SASKATCHEWAN" at bottom | none | 12-345 | 1 to approximately 94-000 | |
| | 1943–44 | Black on white; "SASK.–43" centred at top | none | 12-345 | 1 to approximately 89-000 | Revalidated for 1944 with windshield stickers, due to metal conservation for World War II. |
| | 1945 | Red on white; "SASKATCHEWAN–45" at top | none | 12-345 | 1 to approximately 98-000 | |
| | 1946 | White on red; "46–SASKATCHEWAN" at bottom | none | 12-345 | 1 to approximately 98-000 | |
| | 1947 | Black on orange; "SASKATCHEWAN–47" at bottom | none | 12-345 | 1 to approximately 98-000 | |
| | 1948 | Black on silver; "SASKATCHEWAN 1948" at top | none | 123-456 | 1 to approximately 114-000 | |
| | 1949 | White on brown; "SASKATCHEWAN 1949" at bottom | none | 123-456 | 1 to approximately 130-000 | |
| | 1950 | Black on orange; "SASKATCHEWAN 50" at top | none | 123-456 | 1 to approximately 137-000 | |
| | 1951 | Black on beige; "SASKATCHEWAN 51" at bottom | "WHEAT PROVINCE" at top | 123-456 | 1 to approximately 141-000 | |
| | 1952 | Beige on black; "52 SASKATCHEWAN" at bottom | "WHEAT PROVINCE" at top | 123-456 | 1 to approximately 156-000 | |
| | 1953 | Green on beige; "SASKATCHEWAN 53" at bottom | "WHEAT PROVINCE" at top | 123-456 | 1 to approximately 163-000 | |
| | 1954 | Beige on maroon; "54 SASKATCHEWAN" at bottom | "WHEAT PROVINCE" at top | 123-456 | 1 to approximately 168-000 | |
| | 1955 | Dark green on white; "SASKATCHEWAN" at top | "GOLDEN JUBILEE 1955" at bottom | 123-456 | 1 to approximately 193-000 | Commemorated Saskatchewan's 50 years of provincehood. |
| | 1956 | White on dark green; "SASKATCHEWAN 56" at top | "WHEAT PROVINCE" at bottom | 123-456 | 1 to approximately 192-000 | |
| | 1957 | Dark blue on beige; "57 SASKATCHEWAN" at top | "WHEAT PROVINCE" at bottom | 123-456 | 1 to approximately 195-000 | |
| | 1958 | Red on reflective light grey; "SASKATCHEWAN 58" at top | "WHEAT PROVINCE" at bottom | 123-456 | 1 to 1-000 | Experimental plates. |
| | 1958 | As above, but non-reflective | "WHEAT PROVINCE" at bottom | 123-456 | 1-001 to approximately 201-000 | |
| | 1959 | Black on reflective light grey; "59 SASKATCHEWAN" at top | "WHEAT PROVINCE" at bottom | 123-456 | 1 to 1-000 | Experimental plates. |
| | 1959 | As above, but non-reflective | "WHEAT PROVINCE" at bottom | 123-456 | 1-001 to approximately 218-000 | |
| | 1960 | Light grey on black; "SASKATCHEWAN 60" at top | none | 123-456 | 1 to approximately 239-000 | |
| | 1961 | Dark blue on white; "SASKATCHEWAN 61" at top | none | 123-456 | 1 to approximately 248-000 | |
| | 1962 | White on dark blue; "62 SASKATCHEWAN" at top | none | 123-456 | 1 to approximately 248-000 | |
| | 1963 | Dark blue on orange; "63 SASKATCHEWAN" at top | none | 123-456 | 1 to approximately 261-000 | |
| | 1964 | Green on white; "64 SASKATCHEWAN" at top | none | 123-456 | 1 to approximately 277-000 | |
| | 1965 | White on green; "65 SASKATCHEWAN" at bottom | "DIAMOND JUBILEE" at top | 123-456 | 1 to approximately 287-000 | Commemorated Saskatchewan's 60 years of provincehood. |
| | 1966 | Green on white; "66 SASKATCHEWAN" at bottom | none | 123-456 | 1 to approximately 291-000 | |
| | 1967 | Brown on yellow; "SASKATCHEWAN 1967" at top | "CANADA CENTENNIAL" at bottom | 123-456 | 1 to approximately 304-000 | |
| | 1968 | Green on white; "19" at top left, "68" at top right and "SASKATCHEWAN" at bottom | none | 123-456 | 1 to approximately 311-000 | |
| | 1969 | White on green; "SASKATCHEWAN 1969" at top | none | 123-456 | 1 to approximately 313-000 | |
| | 1970 | Green on reflective white; "SASKATCHEWAN 1970" at top | none | 123-456 | 1 to approximately 308-000 | |
| | 1971 | Red on reflective white; "SASKATCHEWAN 1971" at bottom | none | 123-456 | 1 to approximately 325-000 | |
| | 1972 | Blue on reflective white; "72 SASKATCHEWAN" at top | none | 123-456 | 1 to approximately 315-000 | |
| | 1973 | Red on reflective white; "73 SASKATCHEWAN" at top | "HOME OF THE RCMP" at bottom | 123-456 | 1 to approximately 316-000 | |
| | 1974 | Green on reflective white; "74 SASKATCHEWAN" at bottom | none | 123-456 | 1 to approximately 339-000 | |
| | 1975 | Red on reflective white; "75 SASKATCHEWAN" at bottom | none | 123-456 | 1 to approximately 365-000 | |
| | 1976 | Blue on reflective white; "76 SASKATCHEWAN" at bottom | none | 123-456 | 1 to approximately 383-000 | |

=== 1977 to present ===
As of 2025, Saskatchewan is one of seven provinces/territories in which decals are not used on passenger vehicles to show that the vehicle has valid registration (the others being Quebec, Manitoba, Alberta, Ontario, British Columbia, and the Northwest Territories).

| Image | Dates issued | Design | Slogan | Serial format | Serials issued | Notes |
|---|---|---|---|---|---|---|
| | 1977 – May; 1998 | Green on reflective white with screened wheat graphic in centre; sans-serif "Saskatchewan" screened in green centred at top | none | ABC 123 | HBB 100 to SZZ 999, then random blocks (see right) | 'H', 'J', 'K', 'M', 'N' and 'S' series of serials issued first, followed by random blocks from 1991 onwards. Letters I, O, Q, U and V not used; this practice continued until 2009. |
| | May; 1998 – early 2009 | As above, but with smaller wheat graphic, and serif "Saskatchewan" centred at top | "Land of Living Skies" screened in green centred at bottom | 123 ABC | 100 AAA to 999 GXZ | Front and rear plates required until June 30, 2004; only rear plates required since. The change occurred in the early 'E' series of serials. |
| | early 2009 – present | As above, but with smaller wheat graphic, and serif "Saskatchewan" centred at top | "Land of Living Skies" screened in green centred at bottom | 123 ABC | 001 GYA to 905 PIK (as of July 10, 2026) | Manufactured on aluminium rather than steel, and with former South Dakota serial dies. Letters I, Q, U and V and numbers 001 through 099 added to serials. The stickers on license plates were deprecated in October 2012 to maximize efficiency. |

== Non-passenger baseplates ==
| Image | Type | Dates issued | Design | Slogan | Serial format | Serials issued | Notes |
|---|---|---|---|---|---|---|---|
| | Disabled Driver | | Green on reflective white; sans-serif "Saskatchewan" screened in green centred at top with wheelchair icon to left of number | "Land of Living Skies" | 12345 | unknown | |
| | Motorcycle | | Green on reflective white; sans-serif "Saskatchewan" screened in green centred at top | "Land of Living Skies" | 123AB | unknown to 225RA (As of August 25, 2025) | |

== Specialty plates ==
| Image | Type | First issued | Design | Slogan | Serial format | Serials issued | Notes |
|---|---|---|---|---|---|---|---|
| | Collector | | | "COLLECTOR" | 123-456 | 100-001 to 101-001 (As of April 21, 2024) | |
| | Consular Corps | | | "Consular Corps" | AB-123 | CC-001 to CC-171 (As of March 10, 2024) | |
| | Roughriders | | | "Pride Lives Here" | 12A34 | R1001 to R9999, 1R101 to 9R999, 01R01 to 24R01 (As of November 16, 2025) | |
| | Roughriders Vintage | | | "Rider Nation" | 12345 | 00001 to 03141 (As of September 28, 2022) | Old design still available |
| | Support Our Troops | | | "Support Our Troops" | A1234 | T0001 to T3178 (As of June 28, 2026) | |

=== Military plates ===
| Image | Type | First issued | Design | Slogan | Serial format | Serials issued | Notes |
|---|---|---|---|---|---|---|---|
| | Memorial Cross | | | "Memorial Cross Recipient" | A1234 | M0001 to M0011 (As of November 14, 2024) | |
| | Veteran | | | "Veteran" | A1234 | V1001 to V7799 (As of April 26, 2025) | |
