= Vehicle registration plates of New Brunswick =

New Brunswick
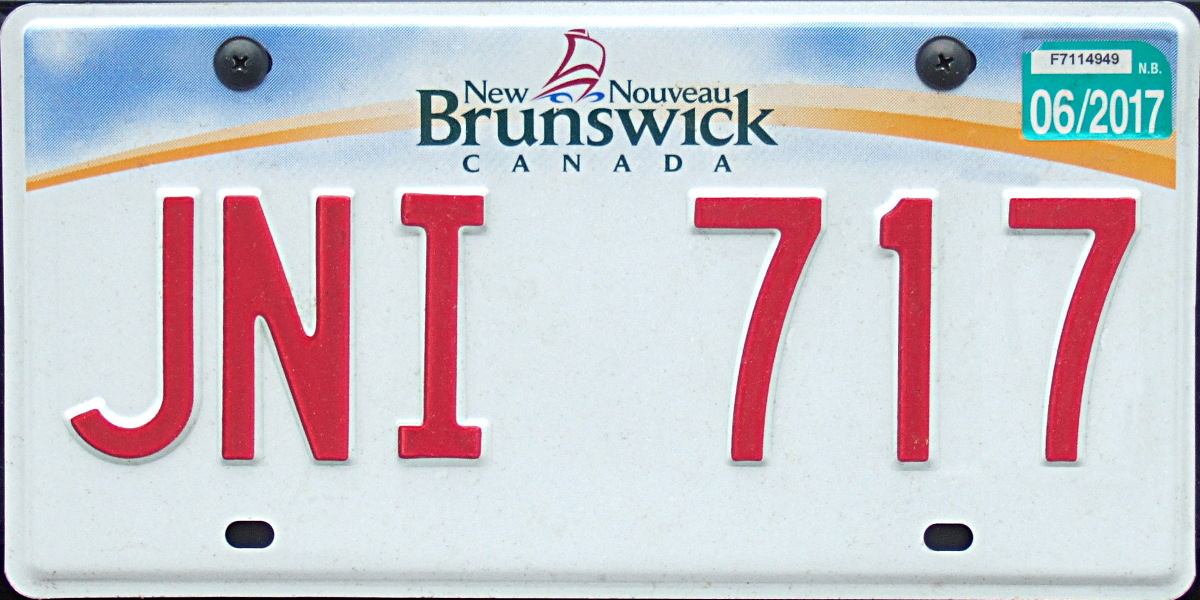

Current series
- Size: 12 in × 6 in 30 cm × 15 cm
- Serial format: ABC 123
- Introduced: 2011

Availability
- Issued by: Department of Justice and Public Safety, Motor Vehicle Branch
- Manufactured by: Waldale Manufacturing Limited, Amherst, Nova Scotia

History
- First issued: 1911

The Canadian province of New Brunswick first required its residents to register their motor vehicles in 1905. Registrants provided their own licence plates for display until 1911, when the province began to issue plates.

As of 2026, plates are issued by the New Brunswick Department of Justice and Public Safety through its Motor Vehicle Branch. Only rear plates have been required on all vehicles since July 15, 2019.

== Passenger baseplates ==
=== 1911 to 1961 ===
In 1956, Canada, the United States and Mexico came to an agreement with the American Association of Motor Vehicle Administrators, the Automobile Manufacturers Association and the National Safety Council that standardized the size for licence plates for vehicles (except those for motorcycles) at 6 inches (15 cm) in height by 12 inches (30 cm) in width, with standardized mounting holes. The first New Brunswick licence plate that complied with these standards was issued seven years beforehand, in 1949 (dated 1950).

| Image | Dates issued | Description | Slogan | Serial format | Serials issued | Notes |
|---|---|---|---|---|---|---|
| | 1911 | Black serial on white porcelain plate; vertical "1911" and "NB" at left and right respectively | none | 123 | 1 to 483 | Those who paid their license tax to the Provincial Board of Works in 1911 were provided with a 6 x 10 inch license plate. |
| | 1912 | Red-orange serial on white porcelain plate; vertical "1912" and "NB" at left and right respectively | none | 123 | 1 to 700 | |
| | 1913 | Black serial on yellow porcelain plate; vertical "1913" and "NB" at left and right respectively | none | 1234 | 701 to 1524 | |
| | 1914 | White serial on green porcelain plate; vertical "1914" and "NB" at left and right respectively | none | 1234 | 701 to approximately 2100 | |
| | 1915 | White serial on red porcelain plate; vertical "1915" and "NB" at left and right respectively | none | 1234 | 701 to approximately 2600 | |
| | 1916 | Dark blue serial on light blue porcelain plate; vertical "1916" and "NB" at left and right respectively | none | 1234 | 3000 to approximately 6500 | |
| | 1917 | Black serial on light yellow porcelain plate; vertical "1917" and "NB" at left and right respectively | none | 1234 | 3000 to approximately 8300 | |
| | 1918 | White serial on black flat metal plate; "N.B. 1918" at left | none | 12345 | 3000 to approximately 11700 | |
| | 1919 | Black serial on white flat metal plate; "N.B. 1919" at left | none | 1234 | 1000 to approximately 8300 | |
| | 1920 | Yellow serial on black flat metal plate; vertical "NB" and "1920" at left and right respectively | none | 12345 | 1000 to approximately 11800 | |
| | 1921 | Brown serial on tan flat metal plate; vertical "NB" and "1921" at left and right respectively | none | 12345 | 1000 to approximately 13500 | |
| | 1922 | Embossed dark green serial on white plate with border line; vertical "NB" and "1922" at left and right respectively | none | 12-345 | 1-000 to approximately 13-600 | First embossed plate. |
| | 1923 | Embossed white serial on dark blue plate with border line; vertical "NB" and "1923" at left and right respectively | none | 12345 | 1000 to approximately 16700 | |
| | 1924 | Embossed dark blue serial on grey plate; vertical "NB" and "1924" at left and right respectively | none | 12345 | 1000 to approximately 20900 | |
| | 1925 | Embossed black serial on light green plate with border line; vertical "NB" and "1925" at left and right respectively | none | 12-345 | 1-000 to approximately 19-400 | |
| | 1926 | Embossed white serial on black plate with border line; vertical "NB" and "1926" at left and right respectively | none | 12345 | 1000 to approximately 23200 | |
| | 1927 | Embossed black serial on cream plate with border line; vertical "1927" and "NB" at left and right respectively | none | 12-345 | 3-000 to approximately 24-700 | |
| | 1928 | Embossed white serial on maroon plate with border line; "NEW BRUNSWICK-28" at bottom | none | 12-345 | 3-000 to approximately 28-500 | First use of the full province name. |
| | 1929 | Embossed white serial on teal plate with border line; "NEW BRUNSWICK-29" at top | none | 12-345 | 5-000 to approximately 32-200 | |
| | 1930 | Embossed maroon serial on silver plate with border line; "NEW BRUNSWICK-30" at bottom | none | 12345 | 5000 to approximately 35000 | |
| | 1931 | Embossed orange serial on dark purple plate; "NEW BRUNSWICK-31" at top | none | A-1234 | Probably coded by region | |
| | 1932 | Embossed black serial on white plate with border line; "NEW BRUNSWICK-32" at bottom | none | A-1234 | Coded by region (A) | |
| | 1933 | Embossed white serial on dark blue plate; "NEW BRUNSWICK-33" at top | none | A-1234 | Coded by region (A) | |
| | 1934 | Embossed blue serial on white plate with border line; "34-NEW BRUNSWICK" at bottom | none | A-1234 | Coded by region (A) | |
| | 1935 | Embossed silver serial on black plate; "NEW BRUNSWICK-35" at top | none | A-1234 | Coded by region (A) | |
| | 1936 | Embossed black serial on white plate; "NEW BRUNSWICK-36" at bottom | none | A-1234 | Coded by region (A) | |
| | 1937 | Embossed white serial on black plate; "NEW BRUNSWICK - 37" at bottom | none | 12-345 | 1-000 to approximately 34-000 | |
| | 1938 | Embossed black serial on silver plate; "NEW BRUNSWICK - 38" at top | none | 12-345 | 1-000 to approximately 34-000 | |
| | 1939 | Embossed white serial on blue plate; "NEW BRUNSWICK - 39" at bottom | none | 12-345 | 1-000 to approximately 34-500 | |
| | 1940 | Embossed yellow serial on dark green plate; "NEW BRUNSWICK - 40" at top | none | 12-345 | 2-000 to approximately 36-500 | |
| | 1941 | Embossed beige serial on brown plate; "NEW BRUNSWICK - 41" at bottom | none | 12-345 | 2-000 to approximately 36-500 | |
| | 1942–44 | Embossed yellow serial on dark blue plate; "42 - NEW BRUNSWICK" at top | none | 12·345 | 2·000 to approximately 37·500 | Revalidated for 1943 and 1944 with windshield stickers, due to metal conservation for World War II. |
| | 1945 | Embossed yellow serial on black plate; "NEW BRUNSWICK - 45" at top | none | 12·345 | 1·000 to approximately 30·500 | |
| | 1946 | Embossed white serial on dark blue plate; "NEW BRUNSWICK-46" at bottom | none | 12·345 | 1·000 to approximately 35·500 | |
| | 1947 | Embossed white serial on brown plate; "NEW BRUNSWICK-47" at bottom | none | 12·345 | 1·000 to approximately 40·000 | |
| | 1948 | Embossed white serial on black plate; "48-NEW BRUNSWICK" at top | none | 12·345 | 1000 to approximately 42·500 | |
| | 1949 | Embossed white serial on maroon plate; "49-NEW BRUNSWICK" at bottom | none | 12·345 | 1·000 to approximately 46·500 | |
| | 1950 | Embossed white serial on dark blue plate with border line; "NEW BRUNSWICK – 50" at top | none | 12·345 | 1·000 to approximately 53·000 | |
| | 1951 | Embossed white serial on green plate with border line; "NEW BRUNSWICK – 51" at bottom | none | 12·345 | 1·000 to approximately 58·000 | |
| | 1952 | Embossed white serial on maroon plate with border line; "52 – NEW BRUNSWICK" at top | none | 12·345 | 1·000 to approximately 64·000 | |
| | 1953 | Embossed white serial on black plate with border line; "53 – NEW BRUNSWICK" at bottom | none | 12·345 | 1·000 to approximately 68·000 | |
| | 1954 | Embossed green serial on white plate with border line; embossed provincial shield used as separator; "54 - NEW BRUNSWICK" at top | none | 12-345 | 1-000 to approximately 77-000 | |
| | 1955 | Embossed white serial on green plate with border line; embossed provincial shield used as separator; "55 – NEW BRUNSWICK" at bottom | none | 12-345 | 1-000 to approximately 79-000 | |
| | 1956 | As 1954 base, but with "56 – NEW BRUNSWICK" at top | none | 12-345 | 1-000 to approximately 90-000 | |
| | 1957 | As 1955 base, but with "57 – NEW BRUNSWICK" at bottom | none | 12-345 | 1-000 to approximately 99-999 | |
| | 1958 | Embossed green serial on white plate with border line; embossed provincial shield used as separator; "58 – NEW BRUNSWICK" at top | "PICTURE PROVINCE" centred at bottom | 123-456 | 10-00 to approximately 109-000 | |
| | 1959 | Embossed white serial on green plate with border line; embossed provincial shield used as separator; "NEW BRUNSWICK – 59" at top | "PICTURE PROVINCE" centred at bottom | 123-456 | 10-00 to approximately 110-000 | |
| | 1960–61 | As 1958 base, but with "60 – NEW BRUNSWICK" at top | "PICTURE PROVINCE" centred at bottom | 123-456 | 10-00 to approximately 130-000 | Revalidated for 1961 with windshield stickers. |

=== 1962 to present ===
| Image | Dates issued | Description | Slogan | Serial format | Serials issued | Notes |
|---|---|---|---|---|---|---|
| | 1962–63 | Embossed white serial on red plate with border line; "NEW BRUNSWICK" at top, offset to left; embossed white box at top right containing debossed "62" | "PICTURE PROVINCE" centred at bottom | 123-456 | 1-000 to approximately 152-000 | |
| | 1964–65 | Embossed white serial on red plate; border lines around plate and around bottom corners; "NEW BRUNSWICK" centred at top; "64" at bottom right | "PICTURE PROVINCE" centred at bottom | 123-456 | 1-000 to approximately 173-000 | |
| | 1966–68 | As 1964–65 base, but with "66" at bottom right | "PICTURE PROVINCE" centred at bottom | 123-456 | 1-000 to approximately 233-000 | |
| | 1969–71 | Embossed red serial on reflective white plate; border lines around plate and around bottom corners; "NEW BRUNSWICK" centred at top; "69" at bottom right | "PICTURE PROVINCE" centred at bottom | 123-456 | 1-000 to approximately 239-000 | |
| | 1972–74 | Embossed green serial on reflective white plate; border lines around plate and around top corners; "NEW BRUNSWICK" and "NOUVEAU-BRUNSWICK" centred at top and bottom respectively; "72" at top right | none | 123-456 | 1-000 to approximately 270-000 | |
| | 1975–77 | As 1972–74 base, but with "75" at top right | none | 123-456 | 1-000 to approximately 321-000 | |
| | 1978–85 | As 1972–74 base, but with "78" at top right | none | 123-456 | 1-000 to approximately 547-000 | |
| | 1986–89 | Embossed blue serial on reflective white plate; border lines around plate and around top corners; "NEW BRUNSWICK" and "NOUVEAU-BRUNSWICK" screened in turquoise centred at top and bottom respectively | none | ABC-123 | AAA-000 to approximately ARZ-999 | |
| | 1989 | As above, but with province names embossed rather than screened | none | ABC-123 | AZA-000 to AZG-999 | Interim plates manufactured while material was changed from ordinary steel to galvanized steel. |
| | 1989–91 | As 1986–89 plates | none | ABC-123 | ASA-000 to approximately AVT-999 | |
| | 1991–2003 | Embossed red serial on reflective white plate; screened provincial wordmark (red galley graphic with "New" and "Nouveau" to the left and "Brunswick" to the right, all in green) centred at top | none | ABC-123 | BAA-000 to BZZ-999; GAA-000 to approximately GIY-499 | C, D and F as first letters reserved for Commercial, Dealer and Farm plates respectively. |
| | 2003–09 | As above, but with revised wordmark ("New" to the left of the galley, "Nouveau" to the right and "Brunswick" and "CANADA" below) | none | ABC-123 | GIY-500 to GWZ-999 | |
| | 2009–11 | Embossed red serial on reflective white plate with curved gold and sky blue bands at the top; screened provincial wordmark (red galley graphic with small blue waves and "New" to the left, "Nouveau" to the right and "Brunswick" and "CANADA" below, all in green) on bands, centred above serial | "Be... in this place ᐧ Être... ici on le peut" screened in green centred at bottom | ABC 123 | GXA 000 to GZZ 999; JAA 000 to JDZ 999 | H as first letter reserved for Taxi plates. |
| | 2011–present | Embossed red serial on reflective white plate with curved gold and sky blue bands at the top; screened provincial wordmark (red galley graphic with small blue waves and "New" to the left, "Nouveau" to the right and "Brunswick" and "CANADA" below, all in green) on bands, centred above serial | none | ABC 123 | JEA 000 to KFR 200 (As of November 12, 2024) | Only rear plates required beginning July 15, 2019. |

== Commercial baseplates ==
| Image | Type | First issued | Description | Slogan | Serial format | Serials issued | Notes |
|---|---|---|---|---|---|---|---|
| | Commercial | 1986 | Embossed blue serial on reflective white plate; border lines around plate and around top corners; "NEW BRUNSWICK" and "NOUVEAU-BRUNSWICK" screened in turquoise centred at top and bottom respectively | none | CA1-234 | | First letter C reserved for Commercial plates |
| | Commercial | 2009-11 | Embossed red serial on reflective white plate with curved gold and sky blue bands at the top; screened provincial wordmark (red galley graphic with small blue waves and "New" to the left, "Nouveau" to the right and "Brunswick" and "CANADA" below, all in green) on bands, centred above serial | "Be... in this place ᐧ Être... ici on le peut" screened in green centred at bottom | CAB 123 | | First letter C reserved for Commercial plates |
| | Commercial | 2011-present | Embossed red serial on reflective white plate with curved gold and sky blue bands at the top; screened provincial wordmark (red galley graphic with small blue waves and "New" to the left, "Nouveau" to the right and "Brunswick" and "CANADA" below, all in green) on bands, centred above serial | none | CAB 123 | CRA 001 to CXT 983 (As of November 10, 2023) | First letter C reserved for Commercial plates |

=== Truck plates ===
| Image | First issued | Description | Slogan | Serial format | Serials issued | Notes |
|---|---|---|---|---|---|---|
| | 1991-2003 | Embossed red serial on reflective white plate; screened provincial wordmark (red galley graphic with "New" and "Nouveau" to the left and "Brunswick" to the right, all in green) centred at top | none | L12-345 | | |
| | 1991-2003 | Embossed red serial on reflective white plate; screened provincial wordmark (red galley graphic with "New" and "Nouveau" to the left and "Brunswick" to the right, all in green) centred at top | none | L123456 | | |
| | 2003-09 | | none | L123456 | | |
| | 2003-09 | | none | LAB 123 | LAA 001 to LAR 250 | |
| | 2009-11 | Embossed red serial on reflective white plate with curved gold and sky blue bands at the top; screened provincial wordmark (red galley graphic with small blue waves and "New" to the left, "Nouveau" to the right and "Brunswick" and "CANADA" below, all in green) on bands, centred above serial | "Be... in this place ᐧ Être... ici on le peut" screened in green centred at bottom | LAB 123 | LAU 068 to LBI 686 | Also used on Transit busses |
| | 2011-present | Embossed red serial on reflective white plate with curved gold and sky blue bands at the top; screened provincial wordmark (red galley graphic with small blue waves and "New" to the left, "Nouveau" to the right and "Brunswick" and "CANADA" below, all in green) on bands, centred above serial | none | LAB 123 | LBI 687 to LDA 683 (As of October 14, 2023) | |

=== Prorated plates ===
| Image | First issued | Description | Slogan | Serial format | Serials issued | Notes |
|---|---|---|---|---|---|---|
| | 1986 | Embossed blue serial on reflective white plate; border lines around plate and around top corners; "NEW BRUNSWICK" and "NOUVEAU-BRUNSWICK" screened in turquoise centred at top and bottom respectively | none | PR12345 | | PRP Plan |
| | 2009-2011 | Embossed red serial on reflective white plate with curved gold and sky blue bands at the top; screened provincial wordmark (red galley graphic with small blue waves and "New" to the left, "Nouveau" to the right and "Brunswick" and "CANADA" below, all in green) on bands, centred above serial | "Be... in this place ᐧ Être... ici on le peut" screened in green centred at bottom | PAB 123 | PTF 001 to PTO 041 | PRP Plan |
| | 2011-present | Embossed red serial on reflective white plate with curved gold and sky blue bands at the top; screened provincial wordmark (red galley graphic with small blue waves and "New" to the left, "Nouveau" to the right and "Brunswick" and "CANADA" below, all in green) on bands, centred above serial | none | PAB 123 | PTO 042 to PUX 476 (As of October 11, 2023) | PRP Plan |

=== Farm plates ===
| Image | First issued | Description | Slogan | Serial format | Serials issued | Notes |
|---|---|---|---|---|---|---|
| | 2009-11 | Embossed red serial on reflective white plate with curved gold and sky blue bands at the top; screened provincial wordmark (red galley graphic with small blue waves and "New" to the left, "Nouveau" to the right and "Brunswick" and "CANADA" below, all in green) on bands, centred above serial | "Be... in this place ᐧ Être... ici on le peut" screened in green centred at bottom | F12 345 | | First letter F reserved for Farm plates |
| | 2011-present | Embossed red serial on reflective white plate with curved gold and sky blue bands at the top; screened provincial wordmark (red galley graphic with small blue waves and "New" to the left, "Nouveau" to the right and "Brunswick" and "CANADA" below, all in green) on bands, centred above serial | none | F12 345 | F22 001 to F27 541 (As of October 29, 2021) | First letter F reserved for Farm plates |

=== Taxi plates ===
| Image | First issued | Description | Slogan | Serial format | Serials issued | Notes |
|---|---|---|---|---|---|---|
| | 2009-11 | Embossed red serial on reflective white plate with curved gold and sky blue bands at the top; screened provincial wordmark (red galley graphic with small blue waves and "New" to the left, "Nouveau" to the right and "Brunswick" and "CANADA" below, all in green) on bands, centred above serial | "Be... in this place ᐧ Être... ici on le peut" screened in green centred at bottom | H12 345 | | H as first letter reserved for Taxi plates. |
| | 2011-present | Embossed red serial on reflective white plate with curved gold and sky blue bands at the top; screened provincial wordmark (red galley graphic with small blue waves and "New" to the left, "Nouveau" to the right and "Brunswick" and "CANADA" below, all in green) on bands, centred above serial | none | H12 345 | H21 415 to H25 864 (As of September 17, 2023) | H as first letter reserved for Taxi plates. |

== Other non-passenger baseplates ==
=== Antique vehicle plates ===
License plates designated for Historic cars.

| Image | First issued | Description | Slogan | Serial format | Serials issued | Notes |
|---|---|---|---|---|---|---|
| | 1991–2003 | Embossed red serial on reflective white plate; screened provincial wordmark (red galley graphic with "New" and "Nouveau" to the left and "Brunswick" to the right, all in green) centred at top | none | | | |
| | 2003–09 | As above, but with revised wordmark ("New" to the left of the galley, "Nouveau" to the right and "Brunswick" and "CANADA" below) | none | AB1 234 | AA1 001 to unknown | |
| | 2009-11 | Embossed red serial on reflective white plate with curved gold and sky blue bands at the top; screened provincial wordmark (red galley graphic with small blue waves and "New" to the left, "Nouveau" to the right and "Brunswick" and "CANADA" below, all in green) on bands, centred above serial | "Be... in this place ᐧ Être... ici on le peut" screened in green centred at bottom | AB1 234 | | |
| | 2011–present | Embossed red serial on reflective white plate with curved gold and sky blue bands at the top; screened provincial wordmark (red galley graphic with small blue waves and "New" to the left, "Nouveau" to the right and "Brunswick" and "CANADA" below, all in green) on bands, centred above serial | none | AB1 234 | unknown to AA5 852 (As of July 23, 2022) | |

=== Trailer plates ===
| Image | First issued | Description | Slogan | Serial format | Serials issued | Notes |
|---|---|---|---|---|---|---|
| | 1986 | Embossed blue serial on reflective white plate; border lines around plate and around top corners; "NEW BRUNSWICK" and "NOUVEAU-BRUNSWICK" screened in turquoise centred at top and bottom respectively | none | TA1-234 | | |
| | 1991-2003 | Embossed red serial on reflective white plate; screened provincial wordmark (red galley graphic with "New" and "Nouveau" to the left and "Brunswick" to the right, all in green) centred at top | none | TAB 123 | | |
| | 2003–09 | As above, but with revised wordmark ("New" to the left of the galley, "Nouveau" to the right and "Brunswick" and "CANADA" below) | none | TAB 123 | | |
| | 2009-11 | Embossed red serial on reflective white plate with curved gold and sky blue bands at the top; screened provincial wordmark (red galley graphic with small blue waves and "New" to the left, "Nouveau" to the right and "Brunswick" and "CANADA" below, all in green) on bands, centred above serial | "Be... in this place ᐧ Être... ici on le peut" screened in green centred at bottom | TAB 123 | | |
| | 2011-present | Embossed red serial on reflective white plate with curved gold and sky blue bands at the top; screened provincial wordmark (red galley graphic with small blue waves and "New" to the left, "Nouveau" to the right and "Brunswick" and "CANADA" below, all in green) on bands, centred above serial | none | TAB 123 | TNA 101 to TVC 792 (As of December 1, 2023) | |

=== Motorcycle plates ===
| Image | First issued | Description | Slogan | Serial format | Serials issued | Notes |
|---|---|---|---|---|---|---|
| | 2009-11 | Embossed red serial on reflective white plate with curved gold and sky blue bands at the top; screened provincial wordmark (red galley graphic with small blue waves and "New" to the left, "Nouveau" to the right and "Brunswick" and "CANADA" below, all in green) on bands, centred above serial | "Be... in this place ᐧ Être... ici on le peut" screened in green centred at bottom | ABC12 | | |
| | 2011-present | Embossed red serial on reflective white plate with curved gold and sky blue bands at the top; screened provincial wordmark (red galley graphic with small blue waves and "New" to the left, "Nouveau" to the right and "Brunswick" and "CANADA" below, all in green) on bands, centred above serial | none | ABC12 | YJY37 to ZFO06 (As of October 31, 2026) | |

=== ATV plates ===
| Image | First issued | Description | Slogan | Serial format | Serials issued | Notes |
|---|---|---|---|---|---|---|
| | 1986 | Embossed blue serial on reflective white plate; border lines around plate and around top corners; "NEW / NOUVEAU" and "BRUNSWICK" screened in turquoise centred at top and bottom respectively | none | AB12345 | issued | notes |
| | 2003-09 | | none | AB1-234 | | |
| | 2009-11 | Embossed red serial on reflective white plate with curved gold and sky blue bands at the top; screened provincial wordmark (red galley graphic with small blue waves and "New" to the left, "Nouveau" to the right and "Brunswick" and "CANADA" below, all in green) on bands, centred above serial | "Be... in this place ᐧ Être... ici on le peut" screened in green centred at bottom | AB1-234 | | |
| | 2011-present | Embossed red serial on reflective white plate with curved gold and sky blue bands at the top; screened provincial wordmark (red galley graphic with small blue waves and "New" to the left, "Nouveau" to the right and "Brunswick" and "CANADA" below, all in green) on bands, centred above serial | none | AB1-234 | unknown to YE6 025 (As of September 15, 2023) | |

=== Dealer plates ===
| Image | First issued | Description | Slogan | Serial format | Serials issued | Notes |
|---|---|---|---|---|---|---|
| | 2009-11 | Embossed red serial on reflective white plate with curved gold and sky blue bands at the top; screened provincial wordmark (red galley graphic with small blue waves and "New" to the left, "Nouveau" to the right and "Brunswick" and "CANADA" below, all in green) on bands, centred above serial | "Be... in this place ᐧ Être... ici on le peut" screened in green centred at bottom | D12 345 | | First letter D reserved for Dealer plates |
| | 2011-present | Embossed red serial on reflective white plate with curved gold and sky blue bands at the top; screened provincial wordmark (red galley graphic with small blue waves and "New" to the left, "Nouveau" to the right and "Brunswick" and "CANADA" below, all in green) on bands, centred above serial | none | D12 345 | unknown to D21 547 (As of May 10, 2023) | First letter D reserved for Dealer plates |

=== Seasonal plates ===
| Image | First issued | Description | Slogan | Serial format | Serials issued | Notes |
|---|---|---|---|---|---|---|
| | 2009-11 | Embossed red serial on reflective white plate with curved gold and sky blue bands at the top; screened provincial wordmark (red galley graphic with small blue waves and "New" to the left, "Nouveau" to the right and "Brunswick" and "CANADA" below, all in green) on bands, centred above serial | "Be... in this place ᐧ Être... ici on le peut" screened in green centred at bottom | SAB 123 | | |
| | 2011-present | Embossed red serial on reflective white plate with curved gold and sky blue bands at the top; screened provincial wordmark (red galley graphic with small blue waves and "New" to the left, "Nouveau" to the right and "Brunswick" and "CANADA" below, all in green) on bands, centred above serial | none | SAB 123 | SAA 001 to SAF 522 (As of May 25, 2019) | |

=== Firefighter plates ===
| Image | First issued | Description | Slogan | Serial format | Serials issued | Notes |
|---|---|---|---|---|---|---|
| | 2009-11 | Embossed red serial on reflective white plate with curved gold and sky blue bands at the top; screened provincial wordmark (red galley graphic with small blue waves and "New" to the left, "Nouveau" to the right and "Brunswick" and "CANADA" below, all in green) on bands, centred above serial | "Be... in this place ᐧ Être... ici on le peut" screened in green centred at bottom | AB123 | | |
| | 2011-present | Embossed red serial on reflective white plate with curved gold and sky blue bands at the top; screened provincial wordmark (red galley graphic with small blue waves and "New" to the left, "Nouveau" to the right and "Brunswick" and "CANADA" below, all in green) on bands, centred above serial | none | AB123 | RJ825 to RS890 (As of October 26, 2023) | |

== Specialty plates ==
The first Conservation license plate featured a Salmon design. In 2009, New Brunswick introduced three new specialty license plate designs; Chickadee, Flower & Deer. The money earned from these plates go to the New Brunswick Wildlife Trust Fund.

| Image | Type | First issued | Description | Slogan | Serial format | Serials issued | Notes |
|---|---|---|---|---|---|---|---|
| | Conservation Salmon | 2000 | Embossed red serial on reflective white plate | "Conservation" | ABC 123 | | |
| | Conservation Salmon | 2009-present | Embossed red serial on reflective white plate with curved gold and sky blue bands at the top; screened provincial wordmark (red galley graphic with small blue waves and "New" to the left, "Nouveau" to the right and "Brunswick" and "CANADA" below, all in green) on bands, centred above serial | "Conservation" | ABC 123 | | |
| | Conservation Chickadee | 2009 | Embossed red serial on reflective white plate with curved gold and sky blue bands at the top; screened provincial wordmark (red galley graphic with small blue waves and "New" to the left, "Nouveau" to the right and "Brunswick" and "CANADA" below, all in green) on bands, centred above serial | "Conservation" | ABC 123 | | |
| | Conservation Flower | 2009 | Embossed red serial on reflective white plate with curved gold and sky blue bands at the top; screened provincial wordmark (red galley graphic with small blue waves and "New" to the left, "Nouveau" to the right and "Brunswick" and "CANADA" below, all in green) on bands, centred above serial | "Conservation" | ABC 123 | | |
| | Conservation Deer | 2009 | Embossed red serial on reflective white plate with curved gold and sky blue bands at the top; screened provincial wordmark (red galley graphic with small blue waves and "New" to the left, "Nouveau" to the right and "Brunswick" and "CANADA" below, all in green) on bands, centred above serial | "Conservation" | ABC 123 | | |
| | Veteran | 2003 | | "VETERAN / ANCIEN COMBATTANT" | WA 123 | WA001 to WZ 999 | |
| | Veteran | 2021-present | Embossed red serial on reflective white plate with curved gold and sky blue bands at the top; screened provincial wordmark (red galley graphic with small blue waves and "New" to the left, "Nouveau" to the right and "Brunswick" and "CANADA" below, all in green) on bands, centred above serial with red poppy to the left of serial | "VETERAN / ANCIEN COMBATTANT" | WAB01 | WAA01 to WAX19 (As of November 30, 2023) | |
