= Vehicle registration plates of Nunavut =

Nunavut
Current series
- Size: 12 in × 6 in 30 cm × 15 cm
- Serial format: 123 456
- Introduced: 2025

History
- First issued: 1999

The Canadian territory of Nunavut was formed in April 1999 when it was split from the Northwest Territories (NWT). At the time of division, the governments of both territories agreed to continue to use the NWT's polar bear-shaped license plates, which had been in use since 1970. Although the design of the plates was shared, the government of the NWT held the copyright. Nunavut's version of the plate differed from the NWT's in the name of the jurisdiction at the bottom and the presence of an 'N' suffix in the serial.

In 2010, the government of the NWT decided to update its version of the polar bear-shaped plate. In turn, the government of Nunavut opted to go with a new plate design. On 3 August 2011, Nunavut announced that a contest would be held to create the new plates.

A total of 123 people entered the contest, submitting 200 designs. On 6 March 2012, Iqaluit resident Ron Froese was named the winner. His design consisted of a night scene featuring a polar bear, an inuksuk, three sets of northern lights to represent the three regions of Nunavut (Kitikmeot, Kivalliq and Qikiqtaaluk), and 25 stars to represent the communities of the territory. This design was first made available to motorists in July 2012.

In 2024, the government of Nunavut announced it would return to the polar bear shape, which it would use under an agreement with the government of the Northwest Territories. Aside from the shape, the plate design would be different from the design used in the NWT. During the summer of 2025, Nunavut officially presented the bear-shaped plate. The plate has a yellow border, and the bear looks to the left. The word Nunavut appears at the top of the plate.

== Passenger baseplates 1999 to present ==
Image	First issued	Design	Slogan	Serial format	Serials issued	Notes
	April 1999	Embossed blue serial on polar bear-shaped white plate with border line; "NUNAVUT" centred at bottom	"EXPLORE CANADA'S ARCTIC" at top	12345N	10000N to approximately 22500N	Only single plates issued.
	July 2012	Screened black serial on rectangular plate with night scene featuring polar bear, inuksuk, three sets of northern lights and 25 stars; "Nunavut" screened in black letters and in Inuktitut syllabics (ᓄᓇᕗᑦ) centred at bottom	None	123 456	000 001 to approximately 017 300	
	August 2025	Embossed blue serial on polar bear-shaped white plate with yellow border line, inuksuk separating the numbers, blue star on top right, and above, "Nunavut" screened in blue letters and in Inuktitut syllabics (ᓄᓇᕗᑦ) centred at top	None	123 456	approximately 017 300 to 017 363 (as of September 12, 2025)	

== Non-passenger plates ==
Image	Type	First issued	Design	Serial format	Serials issued	Notes
	Quad/Snowmobile	1999	Orange polar bear plate	12345A		
	ATV	2012	As 2012 passenger base	A12 345	A00 001 to A05 604 (As of September 12, 2022)	Replaced the snowmobile plate.
	Commercial	1999	Embossed blue serial on polar bear-shaped white plate with border line; "NUNAVUT" centred at bottom	C1234N		
	Commercial	2012	As 2012 passenger base	C12 345	C00 001 to C05 114 (As of September 12, 2022)	
	Dealer	2012	As 2012 passenger base	D12 345	D00 001 to D00 223 (As of September 12, 2022)	
	Government	2012	As 2012 passenger base	G12 345	G00 001 to G02 059 (As of September 12, 2022)	
	Public Service	2012	As 2012 passenger base	P12 345	P00 001 to P01 739 (As of September 12, 2022)	Used on taxis.
	Rental Vehicle	1999	Embossed blue serial on polar bear-shaped white plate with border line; "Nunavut" and in Inuktitut syllabics (ᓄᓇᕗᑦ), centred at bottom	RE123N		
	Rental Vehicle	2012	As 2012 passenger base	R12 345	R00 001 to R00 632 (As of September 12, 2022)	
	Motorcycle	1999	Embossed blue serial on polar bear-shaped white plate with border line; "Nunavut" and in Inuktitut syllabics (ᓄᓇᕗᑦ), centred at bottom	12345N		
	Motorcycle	2012	As 2012 passenger base	M12 345	M00 001 to M00 546 (As of September 12, 2022)	
	Trailer	1999	Embossed blue serial on polar bear-shaped white plate with border line; "Nunavut", and in Inuktitut syllabics (ᓄᓇᕗᑦ) centred at bottom	T12345		
	Trailer	2012	As 2012 passenger base	T12 345	T00 001 to present	Validated annually.
