= Vehicle registration plates of Alberta =

Alberta
Current series
- Slogan: Strong and Free
- Size: 12 in × 6 in 30 cm × 15 cm
- Material: Aluminum
- Serial format: ABC-1234
- Front plate: Optional for Vanity plates, otherwise not present.
- Rear plate: Required
- Introduced: 2026

Availability
- Issued by: Service Alberta
- Manufactured by: Waldale Manufacturing

History
- First issued: 1906

The Canadian province of Alberta first required its residents to register their motor vehicles in 1906. Registrants provided their own licence plates for display until 1912, when the province began to issue plates. Only rear plates have been required since 1992.

== List of plate issues ==
=== 1912 to 1915 ===
When the first plates were issued in Alberta, a number of materials were tried. 1912 and 1913 used porcelain enameled iron, and 1914 and 1915 used thin sheet metal with silkscreened number rolled over a wire frame. Serials issued started at 1 every year, and every year the registrant could request the same number as the previous year. The 1912 plate followed the design of other provinces, but 1913 to 1915 featured the Alberta shield and year on the left side. Registration expired December 31.

Image	Issued	Design	Serials issued
	1912	white on dark blue	1 to approximately 2400
	1913	white on red	1 to approximately 3800
	1914	black on white	1 to approximately 5000
	1915	black on yellow	1 to approximately 5800

=== 1916 to 1920 ===
Starting with the 1916 issue, a heavier gauge of metal was used, and the text moved to the right side, saying ALTA, and the year. The 1918 plates were the first embossed plates, and 1920 had the first painted border.

Image	Issued	Design	Serials issued
	1916	dark blue on white	1 to approximately 10000
	1917	black on yellow	1 to approximately 22000
	1918	white on black	1 to approximately 35000
	1919	black on white	1 to approximately 36000
	1920	white on green	1 to approximately 38000

=== 1921 to 1924 ===
The 1921 to 1924 issues each used several plate sizes, depending on the length of the serial. Hyphens were also used in serials for the first time.

Image	Issued	Design	Serials issued
	1921	blue on gray	1 to approximately 40-000
	1922	yellow on black	1 to approximately 43-000
	1923	white on black	1 to approximately 41-000
	1924	red on gray	1 to approximately 43-000

=== 1925 to 1936 ===
The 1925 base was the first to feature the full province name. Six-digit serials were used for the first time in 1929.

Image	Issued	Design	Serials issued
	1925	yellow on black	1 to approximately 52-000
	1926	black on yellow	1 to approximately 65-000
	1927	black on light green	1 to approximately 69-000
	1928	white on blue	1 to approximately 84-000
	1929	black on orange	1 to approximately 101-000
	1930	white on green	1 to approximately 93-000
	1931	white on blue	1 to approximately 88-000
	1932	black on white	1 to approximately 82-000
	1933	blue on yellow	1 to approximately 76-000
	1934	red on white	1 to approximately 75-000
	1935	white on red	1 to approximately 75-000
	1936	orange on black	1 to approximately 77-000

=== 1937 to 1951 ===
In 1937, the licence year was changed to April 1 to March 31, and continued as such until 1984. The 1940 (expiring March 31, 1941) base was the first to feature a slogan, namely "Drive Safely". This slogan was used again on the 1941 (expiring March 31, 1942) base, before the 1942 (expiring March 31, 1943) base featured "Canada", the first and thus far only Alberta base to feature the country name. Due to metal conservation for World War II, the 1943 (expiring March 31, 1944) base was revalidated until March 31, 1945, with windshield stickers. Six-digit serials were issued on each base from 1947 through 1951.

Image	Issued	Design	Serials issued
	1937	black on yellow	1 to approximately 85-000
	1938	red on white	1 to approximately 85-000
	1939	black on white	1 to approximately 90-000
	1940	black on yellow	1 to approximately 94-000
	1941	white on black	1 to approximately 93-000
	1942	white on dark blue	1 to approximately 87-000
	1943–44	black on yellow	1 to approximately 96-000
	1945	orange on black	1 to approximately 95-000
	1946	green on white	1 to approximately 98-000
	1947	white on blue	1 to approximately 101-000
	1948	black on white	1 to approximately 115-000
	1949	red on white	1 to approximately 130-000
	1950	white on blue	1 to approximately 153-000
	1951	blue on yellow	1 to approximately 163-000

=== 1952 to 1953 ===
In 1956, Canada, the United States, and Mexico came to an agreement with the American Association of Motor Vehicle Administrators, the Automobile Manufacturers Association and the National Safety Council that standardized the size for licence plates for vehicles (except those for motorcycles) at 6 inches (15 cm) in height by 12 inches (30 cm) in width, with standardized mounting holes. The first Alberta licence plate that complied with these standards was issued four years beforehand, in 1952.

The 1952 base was also the first reflective base, with beaded white characters on a black background. Letters were used in passenger serials for the first time: five-character serials were used, with a single letter in the third and later the second position. The letter Q was not used, while the letters I and O were at a smaller size to prevent confusion with the numbers 1 and 0.

Passenger and dealer plates on this base were revalidated for 1953 with black-on-aluminum "53" tabs. Other vehicle types, however, received new plates for 1953, with dark blue characters on a white background.

Image	Issued	Design	Serial format	Serials issued
	1952–53	white on black	12A34	10A10 to 99Z99
	1952–53	white on black	1A234	1B100 to approximately 9F999

=== 1954 to 1972 ===
Two-letter series were introduced in 1954, with each series initially followed by three digits. In 1960, the number of digits increased to four, with each series running from 0001 to 9000. From 1964 through 1972, only B, C, E, H, J, K, L, N, R, T, X and Z were used as the first letter, with four such letters allocated each year. The 1967 base commemorated the centennial of Canadian Confederation.

Image	Issued	Design	Serial format	Serials issued
	1954	black on orange	AB 123	EE 101 to ZZ 950, with gaps
	1955	yellow on blue	AB-123	BB-101 to ZM-950, with gaps
	1956	red on white	AB 123	unknown
	1957	blue on white	AB 123	unknown
	1958	black on yellow	AB 123	unknown
	1959	green on white	AB 123	unknown
	1960	white on red	AB 1234	BA 0001 to approximately DZ 1900
	1961	blue on yellow	AB 1234	FA 0001 to JZ 9000
	1962	white on green	AB 1234	KA 0001 to approximately RD 3600
	1963	black on white	AB 1234	TA 0001 to approximately ZH 8400
	1964	white on blue	AB-12-34	BA-00-01 to approximately HL-62-00
	1965	red on white	AB-12-34	JA-00-01 to approximately NK-84-00
	1966	blue on white	AB-12-34	RA-00-01 to approximately ZL-76-00
	1967	green on white	AB-12-34	BA-00-01 to approximately HR-95-00
	1968	white on green	AB-12-34	JA-00-01 to approximately NZ-36-00
	1969	yellow on black	AB-12-34	RA-00-01 to approximately ZT-25-00
	1970	white on blue	AB-12-34	BA-00-01 to approximately HZ-46-00
	1971	white on green	AB-12-34	JA-00-01 to approximately NX-78-00
	1972	white on blue	AB-12-34	RA-00-01 to ZZ-90-00

=== 1973 to 1983 ===
The 1973–74 base used the AB-12-34 serial format, with B, C, E, H, K and L used as the first letter. It was also the first base to feature the "Wild Rose Country" slogan, which remains in use today.

The 1975–84 base introduced the ABC-123 serial format, which provided many more combinations. However, only 15 letters were used at first (B, C, D, F, G, H, J, K, L, N, P, R, T, V and X), while others were later used only as the first letter (with some exceptions), and the overall order of issuance was not strictly alphabetical. Most plates on this base were manufactured in Alberta, but some were manufactured in Quebec and Nova Scotia using these provinces' serial dies.

Image	Issued	Design	Serial format	Serials issued
	1973–74	orange on blue	AB-12-34	BA-00-01 to LZ-90-00
	1975–76	black on yellow	ABC-123	JBB-000 to LRP-999
	1977–80	black on yellow	ABC-123	unknown
	1981	black on yellow	ABC-123	MGB-000 to MXX-999; XKK-000 to XXX-999; SBB-000 to SBC-999
	1982	black on yellow	ABC-123	SBD-000 to SXX-999; QBB-000 to QXX-999
	1983–84	black on yellow	ABC-123	EBB-000 to approximately ETP-999

=== 1983 to 2026 ===
A new white, red and blue base was introduced in late 1983. Monthly staggered registration was introduced at the same time, with the month of expiration determined by the first letter of the registrant's surname, and the plate expiring on the last day of the assigned month. Plates were originally manufactured from steel and were reflective; non-reflective plates were introduced in 1993 as a cost-saving measure, while the material changed to aluminum in 1999 due to a steel shortage at the plant where the plates were manufactured. Front and rear plates were required until 1991; only rear plates have been required ever since. Several serial dies have been used on this base, owing to different plate vendors.

The base originally used the ABC-123 serial format, starting at BBB-000. The letters I, O and Q were not used in this format, and A, E, U and Y were used only from 1997, beginning with the TGY series. After YZZ-999 was reached in 2003 (the 'Z' series were reserved for ATVs at the time), previously skipped series containing A, E, U and Y were issued, starting with the BAA series and ending with the TGU series in April 2009. These were followed by the 'Z' series that had not been issued on ATVs, including those containing A, E, U and Y. The 'A' and 'X' series were not issued due to their use on Handicapped and Motorcycle plates respectively.

Some three-letter series were skipped because they had offensive connotations. The BSE series was issued in 2004, but was largely recalled due to a mad cow disease crisis.

As the ABC-123 format neared exhaustion in the late 2000s, the Alberta government launched an initiative to design a new base, with an expected launch date of 2009. This project was eventually put on hold in favour of introducing an ABC-1234 format on the 1984 base. The new format started in June 2010 at BBB-0000, with the letters A, E, I, O, Q and U skipped.

In July 2019, the new Alberta logo was added to the base, with Wild Rose Country being kept. The issuance of the license plates with the new logo started with two out-of-order series: the last series with the old logo, CDT, was followed by CFT and then CFS. After that, regular sequence resumed: CDV through CFR, then (since CFS and CFT have already been issued) CFV and so forth.

As of 2021, month and year expiry stickers were no longer required, but can still be obtained and issued under certain circumstances.

Beginning in October 2021, Alberta began issuing passenger (class 3) license plates with HD 6700 reflective sheeting from 3M. The reflective series began at CKT-1800. This sheeting had been used on several small batches of Antique Auto, Motorcycle, and Veteran plates before being introduced to general issue plates. This is the first time reflective passenger plates had been issued since 1993. The changes also occurred to trailer plates at 6JP0-00, Class 2 commercial plates at 44-P000, and Class 1 commercial plates at the beginning of a new format, 0-AA000; this format would take effect after the exhaustion of the A-00000 to A-99999 series. Dealer plates had the new sheeting introduced at M83000.

Image	Issued	Type	Serial format	Serials issued
	1983–90	Passenger, reflective base	ABC-123	BBB-000 to DZZ-999; FBB-000 to HZZ-999; JBB-000 to LWK-499 (without A, E, U, and Y)
	1990–91	Passenger; Manufactured by L&M Signs on a reflective baseplate.	ABC-123	LWK-500 to MDR-499 (without A, E, U and Y)
	1991–93	Passenger; Pairs were phased out during this time, mid M-series.	ABC-123	MDR-500 to NZZ-999; PBB-000 to PFB-199 (without A, E, U and Y)
	1993–94	Passenger; Beginning of Non-reflective series.	ABC-123	PFB-200 to PZX-199 (without A, E, U and Y)
	1994–95	Passenger; Initial batch of plates manufactured by L&M Signs.	ABC-123	PZX-200 to RRF-199 (without A, E, U and Y)
	1995–96	Passenger; Initial batch of plates manufactured by the Waldale company using New Brunswick dies.	ABC-123	RRF-200 to SLM-199 (without A, E, U and Y)
	1996	Passenger; Second batch made by L&M Signs, featuring round bolt holes.	ABC-123	SLM-200 to SVL-599 (without A, E, U and Y)
	1996–97	Passenger; Third batch made by L&M Signs, featuring dies used on Saskatchewan plates.	ABC-123	SVL-600 to TGW-199 (without A, E, U and Y)
	1997–98	Passenger; Manufactured by Hi-Signs Ltd. of Edmonton.	ABC-123	TGW-200 to UVZ-999 (except some of UJ*)
	1998–2000	Passenger; Hi-Signs batch, some made with Aluminum baseplate.	ABC-123	some of UJ*; UWA-000 to VAE-999; VUR-000 to VVX-999
	2000–03	Passenger; Waldale base with Manitoba dies.	ABC-123	VAF-000 to VUP-999; VVY-000 to WZZ-999; YAA-000 to YZZ-999
	2003 – June 2010	Passenger; Reissued portion of plates including previously skipped vowels series. Some were made using darker paint from New Brunswick plates.	ABC-123	BAA-000 to TGU-999; ZAA-000 to ZGA-999 (only with A, E, U, and/or Y); ZGH-000 to ZZZ-999
	June 2010 – July 2019	Same as before using 7-digit sequence using Waldale's PEI/Mississippi dies.	ABC-1234	BBB-0000 to CDT-9999
	July 2019 – October 2021	Same as before with new logo variety	ABC-1234	CDV-0000 to CKT-1799
	October 2021 – November 2026	Same as before with new reflective baseplate introduced, the first of its type since 1993	ABC-1234	CKT-1800 to DBK-3000 (as of Nov 6, 2026)

=== 2026 - Present ===
In October 2025, the provincial government announced an online vote for the choice of a new license plate design would be held. All 8 choices have replaced "Wild Rose Country" with "Strong and Free", taken from Fortis et Libre (Latin) on the Alberta Coat of Arms, which in turn is from the Canadian national anthem. The new license plate features Moraine Lake and started being issued on November 9th, 2026, continuing the current ABC-1234 format in use since the early 2010s skipping vowels and the letter Q, the current 1983 base will still continue to be valid.

Image	Issued	Type	Serial format	Serials issued
	November 2026 - Present	Passenger; New motto "Strong and Free" and the Moraine Lake featured on new design	ABC-1234	DBS 0000 to DCC 4849 (as of Nov 16, 2026)

=== Personalized plates ===
Alberta first issued personalized plates in 1985. As of 2018, over 80,000 such plates have been issued.

Personalized plates for private passenger vehicles can feature between one and seven characters, including letters, numbers, and spaces, while plates for motorcycles and veterans' vehicles can feature between one and five characters. Special characters, such as hyphens and exclamation marks, are not permitted. As in other jurisdictions, combinations may be rejected or withdrawn by the Registrar of Motor Vehicle Services if they are deemed offensive or confusing.

Personalized plates are issued in pairs, except for motorcycles. Only the rear plate is required to be displayed.

=== Specialty plates ===
A specially designed Support Our Troops plate was introduced on July 22, 2014, to honor current and former members of the Canadian Armed Forces. The design features artwork in honour of the first four Alberta-based Canadian soldiers who died in Afghanistan in April 2002. The plate is available at registry agent locations in Alberta for a one-time $75 fee and a $9 registry agent service charge. For every plate purchased, $55 of the purchase price goes to the Support Our Troops Program managed by the Canadian Forces Morale and Welfare Services.

On November 19, 2018, two specially designed Calgary Flames and Edmonton Oilers plates were introduced, with $55 of each $75 plate going to the Calgary Flames Foundation and the Edmonton Oilers Community Foundation. In the first two months of sales 4507 plates were sold (2750 Oilers plates and 1757 Flames plates), raising over $247,000 for the foundations.

Image	Type	Dates issued	Serial format	Serials issued	Notes
	Support Our Troops	July 22, 2014 – present	AB1234	AA0000 to AG9232 (as of June 24, 2026)	Awarded "Plate of the Year" for best new licence plate of 2014 by the Automobile License Plate Collectors Association, the first time Alberta was so honored.
	Calgary Flames	November 19, 2018 – present	FB0234	FA0000 to FB2512 (as of July 24, 2026)	
	Edmonton Oilers	November 19, 2018 – present	DB1234	DA0000 to DC6006 (as of August 08, 2026)	
	XV Winter Olympic Games	1988	Corresponds to the rear plate	N/A	A specialty plate issued to commemorate the 1988 Winter Olympics held in Calgary. This plate was unique in that it was offered only as a front plate; the rear remained the standard "Wild Rose Country" base. It was valid until the end of 1988.
	Veteran passenger vehicles	2005 to present	VBC12	VAA00 to VTD81 (as of July 21, 2026)	Plates available to veterans, active duty military, and civilians or police who have been involved in certain foreign operations.
Alberta Conservation Plate	Conservation Plate	September 1, 2026 – present	CN1234	CN0000 to CN2120 (as of September 29, 2026)	Became available as of September 2026. A portion of the proceeds from the sale of the plate go towards conservation efforts within the province.

== Non-passenger plates ==
Image	Type	Issued	Design	Serial format	Serials issued
	All-terrain vehicle	1984-1990	red on white	ZBC-123	ZBB-000 to ZGG-999 (Z prefix with no vowels)
	Class 2 Commercial (Restricted)	1984–86	red on white	01-2345	00-0000 to 09-9999
	Class 2 Commercial (Restricted)	1986–present	red on white	12-A345	00-A000 to 48-H999; 49-H000 to 59-L999; (made by Waldale, Manitoba dies) 60-L000 to 99-N999; (made by Waldale, PEI dies) 00-P000 to 43-P999; (New logo) 44-P000 to 17-R704 (Reflective series) (as of May 26, 2026)
	Dealer	1984–present	red on white	D12345	D00000 to D99999, M00000 to M82999, M83000 to M97000 M99150 to M99999 (Lake Moraine Base) Q00000 to Q02299 (Lake Moraine Base)
	Handicapped	1984–present	red on white, plates AAA through AAC were standard design, with a handicap sticker placed on the top right corner. AAD and AAE have the handicap logo printed on the top right corner of the plate.	AAB-123	AAA-000 to AAF-000 (as of June 21, 2026) Handicap placards: ABA-000 to AZZ-999 AAA-0000 to ACY-9999 (as of Nov 11, 2026)
	Motorcycle	1984–86	red on white	123-MBC	000-MBB to 999-MGB (without A, E, U, I, O); Optional plates in smaller sizes were made in the following ranges and issued out of sequence: 000-MXZ to 399-MXZ; 000-MZX to 999-MZX; 000-MZZ to 999-MZZ;
	Motorcycle	1986–99	red on white	XBC-123	XBB-000 to XZY-999 (without A, E, U, I, O); XAA-000 to XAC-699 (stock of plates never issued) Optional plates in smaller sizes were made with the following prefixes and issued out of sequence: XZW, XZX, XZZ
	Motorcycle	1999–2010	red on white	AB123	GS000–ZZ999 (1999 to 2007) AA000–GR999 (2007 to 2009); QA000–QZ999 (2009 to 2010); AQ000-ZQ999 (2010)
	Motorcycle	2010–present	red on white	ABC12	AAA00 to SCC99 (Non-reflective, apart from some specific test batches in the P series) SCD00 to WMV56 (Reflective series) (as of June 27, 2026)
	Veteran Motorcycle	2012–present	red on white, Poppy and Maple Leaf symbol to the left of plate number	VB12	VA00 to VZ99 ZA00 to ZZ99 VXL## (Lake Moraine Base)
	Class 1 Commercial (Livery vehicle)	1984–97	red on white	1-23456	1-00000 to 3-99999
	Class 1 Commercial (Livery vehicle)	1997–2023	red on white	A-12345	B-00000 to C-99999,(1997-2003); F-00000 to H-99999, (2003-2011); J-00000 to L-99999, (2011-2017); E-00000- to E-99999 (2017- December 2018), U-00000 to U-79999 (December 2018 – 2020) U-80000 to U-99999, (New logo) (2020); A-00000 to A-99999 (December 2020-May 2023)
	Class 1 Commercial (Livery vehicle)	2023–present	red on white; reflective sheeting	0-AB123	0-AA000 to 0-JF099 0-JU050 to present (Lake Moraine Base)
	Trailer	1984-unknown	red on white, always featured a white "PERMANENT TRAILER" sticker until stickers were discontinued in 2021.	1234-5A	0000-1A to 9999-9D
	Trailer	unknown–1997	red on white, always featured a white "PERMANENT TRAILER" sticker until stickers were discontinued in 2021.	4567-89	4000-00 to 9999-99
	Trailer	1997-2010	red on white, always featured a white "PERMANENT TRAILER" sticker until stickers were discontinued in 2021.	N123-45	N000-00 to N189-99 (Made by Hi-Signs) N190-00 to N199-99 (Made by L&M Signs with Saskatchewan dies) N200-00 to N999-99 (Made by Hi-Signs); P000-00 to P499-99, (Made by Hi-Signs) P500-00 to P999-99, (Made by Waldale with Manitoba dies from here on after); R000-00 to T999-99, V000-00 to Z799-99; Z800-00 to Z999-99 (Made with Waldale 7-digit dies, same as on PEI plates)
	Trailer	2010–present	red on white	4AB5-67	4AA0-00 to 4ZZ9-99; 5AA0-00 to 5YZ9-99; 5ZA0-00 to 5ZZ9-99 (New logo); 6AA0-00 to 6JN9-99; 6JP0-00 to 6ZZ9-99 (Reflective series); 7AA0-00 to 7BC5-86 (as of July 17, 2026)
	Antique Auto	1984–1999	red on white, "ANTIQUE AUTO" printed on top right corner	2-567	2–500 to 9-999 (1-000 to 2-499 was used for the 1970s yellow Base and initially skipped. These numbers were reissued around 2019 – see below)
	Antique Auto	1999–2019	red on white, "ANTIQUE AUTO" printed on top right corner	A-123	A-000 to Z-999; Changed to 7-digit dies at L-999/M-000 0–000 to 2-499 (reissued the portion of plate numbers initially skipped from the yellow Base)
	Antique Auto	2019–present	red on white, "ANTIQUE AUTO" printed on top right corner	12345	00000 to 02999 (Old logo, Non-reflective) 03000 to 20399 (New logo, Reflective) (as of November 2, 2026)
	Antique Motorcycle	unknown–present	red on white, "ANTIQUE" printed on bottom right corner	Blocks from the Antique Auto series	G-100 to G-199 (needs verification) K-900 to K-999 (needs verification) 10400 to 10499 (needs verification)
	Consular Corps	1984–present	red on white, "CONSULAR CORPS" printed on top right corner	CC-1234	CC-1000 to CC-1932 (as of September 29, 2025) Beginning at CC-1800 the plates are manufactured with reflective sheeting but still feature the old Alberta logo for the time being.

=== Previous plates ===
Image	Type	Issued	Design	Serial format	Serials issued
	Exempt	1974	yellow on blue	12-34-56	Unknown
	Farm	1953	blue on white	F12345	Unknown
