= Société de l'assurance automobile du Québec =

Canadian auto insurance company

Société de l'assurance automobile du Québec (SAAQ)

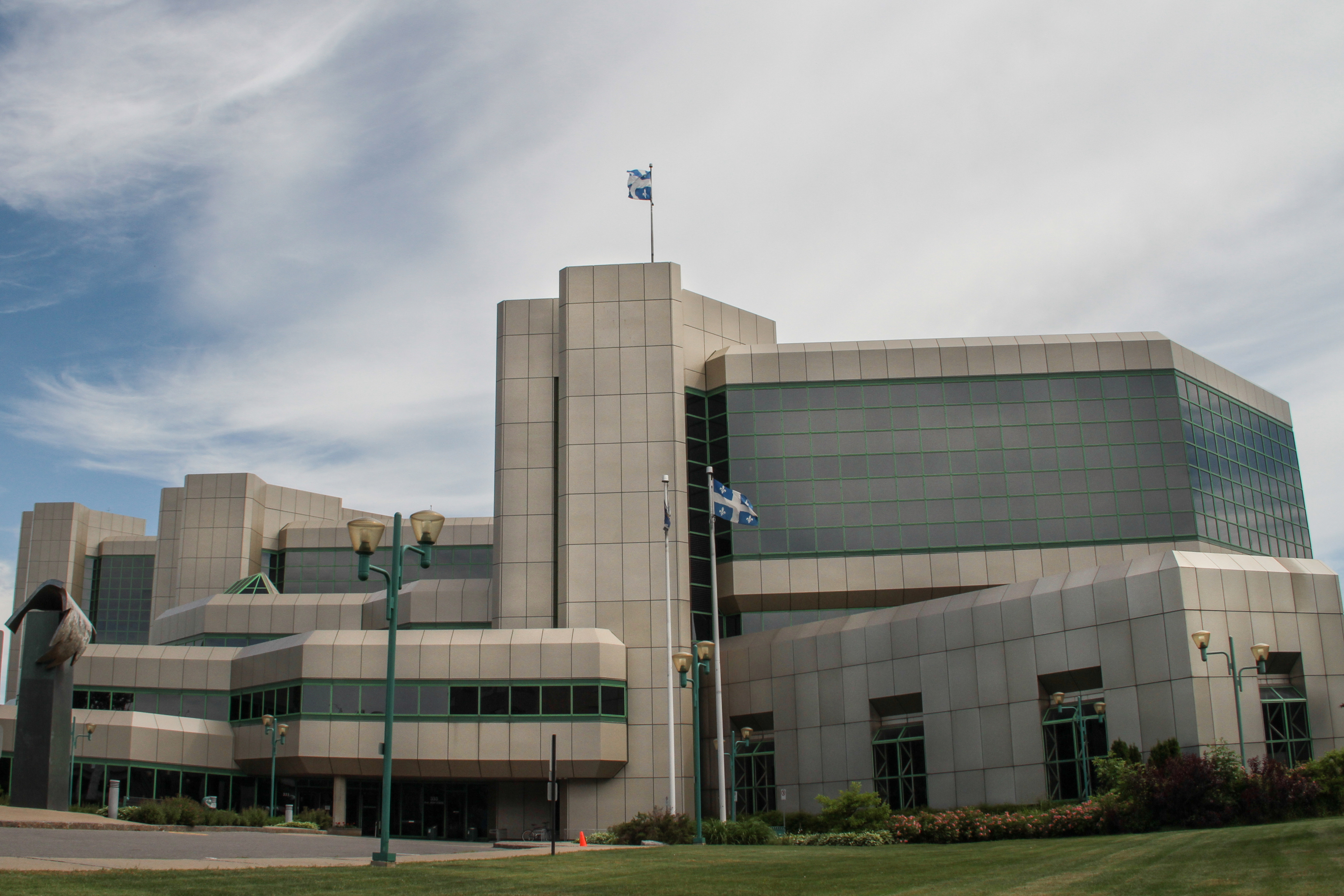
- Headquarters in Quebec City
- Company type: Crown corporation
- Industry: Insurance, driver licensing, motor vehicle registration
- Founded: March 1, 1978
- Headquarters: 333, boulevard Jean-Lesage; Quebec City, Quebec; G1K 8J6
- Key people: Konrad Sioui
- Owner: Government of Quebec
- Number of employees: 4,165 (2022)
- Website: http://www.saaq.gouv.qc.ca/en/

The Société de l'assurance automobile du Québec (SAAQ; English: Quebec Automobile Insurance Corporation, lit. 'Society of assuring automobiles of Quebec') is a Crown corporation responsible for licensing drivers and vehicles in the province of Quebec and providing public auto insurance that insures all drivers, passengers, pedestrians, bicyclists, and motorcyclists involved in road collisions whether or not they are at fault (no-fault insurance). Coverage, however, is limited to personal injuries; damage to property is covered by private insurers.

The SAAQ also administers Quebec's driver's licences, vehicle licence plates and seeks to prevent road accidents, particularly through advertising campaigns in the media and in schools.

The Contrôle routier Québec is part of the SAAQ.

In January 2021, Konrad Sioui became chairman of the board, thereby becoming the first representative of an Indigenous community to lead the board of directors of a Crown corporation in Quebec.

In April 2025, an inquiry began into the SAAQ's digitalization attempts, known as SAAQclic, which ran $500 million over budget; it was investigated by the Gallant Commission.

== See also ==
- Vehicle registration plates of Quebec
- Insurance Corporation of British Columbia
- Manitoba Public Insurance
- Saskatchewan Government Insurance
