= HJL =

HJL may refer to:

== People ==
- H.J.L. Hawkins, of Royal Air Force No. 204 Squadron
- H.J.L. Dunlop, after whom Dunlop Island is named
- Harvey J. Levin, (1924–1992) was an American economist famous for his research into radio waves

== Other ==
- Hamlin Jet, UK company with the ICAO airline code HJL
- Hejjala railway station, a railway station in India
- Tsuutaij, a company with the code HJL on the Mongolian Stock Exchange
- One of the codes used on Canadian veteran licence plates in Newfoundland and Labrador
