= Saskatchewan Government Growth Fund Management Corporation =

- Company type: Crown Corporation
- Industry: Investments
- Founded: 1989
- Headquarters: Regina, Saskatchewan, Canada
- Products: Investment
- Website: SGGFMC

Saskatchewan Government Growth Fund Management Corporation was a crown corporation established by the Government of Saskatchewan in Canada to provide immigrants with an investment option under the federal Immigrant Investor Program (IIP). From 1989 (when the fund was established) until 1999 (when the IIP was discontinued) the fund raised over $275 million in investments. On April 1, 2009, the corporation was wound down and responsibility transferred to Crown Investments Corporation.
