= AirCare =

The logo of AirCare, a cancelled emissions program that ran in British Columbia from 1992 to 2014. This image is not trademarked by TransLink.

AirCare was an initiative started in 1992 to improve air quality in British Columbia, Canada through the systematic testing of road vehicles in order to reduce their emissions. Light-duty vehicles were suggested to be the biggest contributors to air pollutants that form smog and a small percentage of vehicles were contributing a large percentage of the pollutants. AirCare ran for 22 years and was cancelled on December 31, 2014. AirCare was cancelled due to the fact that new vehicles were continuously becoming more eco-friendly, and the percentage of old cars on the road was decreasing.

== History ==
The AirCare emissions program was started in order to reduce carbon emissions by vehicles. Many car models had to pass yearly or biyearly AirCare inspections. The aim was to prevent old cars with high emissions from driving on the road without necessary repairs, thus protecting the air quality and lowering British Columbia's carbon footprint. AirCare was not considered a for-profit program, and charged just enough to cover its costs. For example, in 2013 AirCare was charging $45 per test, but at the start of 2014 demand and therefore cost for the AirCare emissions test dropped to $36. In 2014, the price continued to drop $2 a month, and by December 2014, as the program was about to be cancelled, the price had dropped to $14.

=== Start of program ===
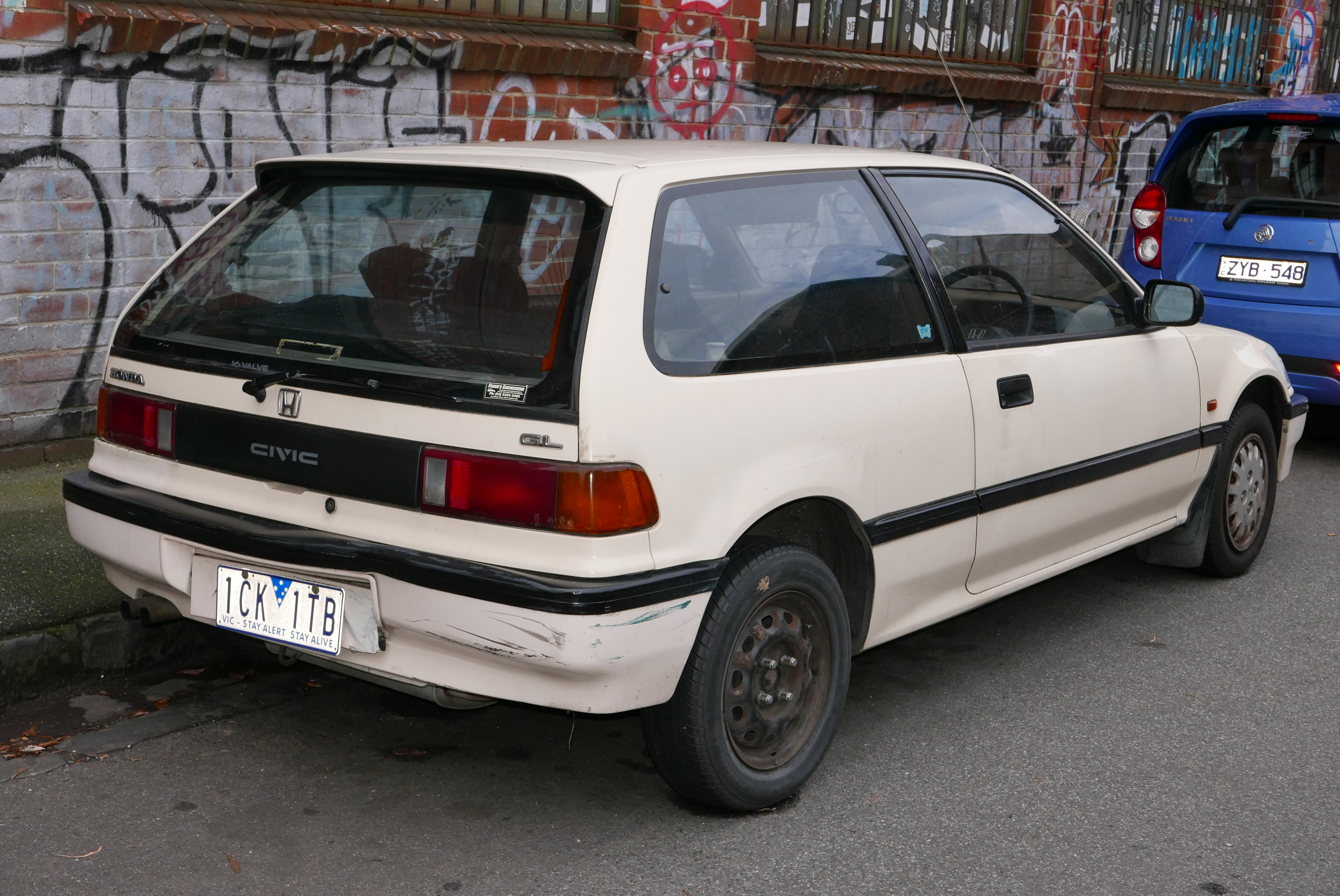
1987 Honda Civic GL Hatchback is an example of an older car that would be required to undergo yearly AirCare tests

The AirCare emissions program was first started in 1992. The aim of this program was to actively monitor all vehicle emissions, and prevent cars with high levels of emissions from driving on the road. This was meant to decrease emissions and allow BC residents to breathe cleaner air. When AirCare was originally passed, all cars manufactured in 1991 or prior had to undergo AirCare evaluation and obtain a passing result yearly. Cars made in 1992 or later had to undergo inspection and obtain a passing result every two years. In order to check if a vehicle needed inspection, any vehicle owner could consult their Insurance Corporation of British Columbia (ICBC) notice to renew document which would have contained the new AirCare "pass" date required to renew a vehicle owner's insurance.

=== AirCare testing ===
Each vehicle type and model year tested for AirCare had its own pass/fail criteria that were dependent on the emissions standards at the time said vehicle was built. AirCare tested for levels of hydrocarbons, carbon monoxide, oxides of nitrogen and diesel particulates. Certain vehicles that were considered light-duty were exempt from AirCare. Such vehicles included:

- vehicle models newer than 2006
- vehicles with vintage or collector plates
- motorcycles, snowmobiles, amphibious vehicles and ATVs
- farm fleet and agricultural vehicles
- motor homes with a net vehicles weight over 3500 kg
- electric vehicles

=== Testing sites ===
Testing sites were provided by Insurance Corporation of British Columbia (ICBC) and other insurance offices, as well as private licensed mechanics and auto-shops. Insurance Corporation of British Columbia (ICBC) goal was to make testing sites accessible to all residents, and many Greater Vancouver areas had their own testing sites. A few testing sites are listed below in order to illustrate AirCare testing site accessibility:

- Abbotsford: 3380 McCallum Road
- Chilliwack: 45730 Airport Road
- Coquitlam: 1316 United Blvd.
- Langley: 5958 205A Street
- Maple Ridge: 11469 Kingston Street
- North Vancouver: 1333 Mckeen Ave.
- Richmond: 11115 Silversmith Place
- Surrey: 7910 130th Street
- Vancouver East: 3608 Charles Street
- Vancouver South: 728 E. Kent Avenue South

== Effectiveness of the program ==
AirCare was effective in preventing high emission vehicles from being legally allowed to drive, and thus reduced vehicle emissions. During the 22 years that the program was in operation, program officials concluded that the program reduced annual emissions by an average of 6,500 tonnes a year. However, AirCare failure rate has been gradually dropping. In 2007, 14% of vehicles that were tested failed AirCare. In 2014, this number dropped to less than 8%. The combination of the reduced emissions of newer cars, and the modifications made to many older cars due to AirCare combined to reduce harmful vehicle emissions.

The AirCare program was estimated to have reduced air emissions from heavy-duty diesel vehicles by 24% or 85 tones per year.

== Cancellation ==
The AirCare program lost its necessity as emission levels in newer cars fell and the number of older vehicles in use decreased. Criticism of the program as an unnecessary "tax-grab" did exist, even though no tax dollars were actually sent into the program. Other factors in the decision of its closure include the rising cost of staff and equipment, resulting in higher costs for ICBC programs. In its lifespan, AirCare did see the number of cars failing its test drop overall.

=== Impact on drivers ===
Waiving the necessity of AirCare to purchase car insurance has made the latter more affordable since the program's cancellation. The reaction regarding AirCare's end was mixed. The view of the people who were against the cancellation was that AirCare was essential for older vehicles on the road, and that it should have expanded to safety issues, beyond just an emission program. On the other hand, others were pleased because they could buy cars without having to get a permit first.

Commercial trucks that were not tested in the past are now under tests since they mostly run on diesel, which emits more pollution than regular gas.

== Other initiatives ==
The British Columbia's innovative Accelerated Vehicle Retirement Program (BC SCRAP-IT) is a program that offers distinct incentive which helps reduce high levels of emission and supports alternative forms of transportation: public transit, membership in ride-share or care-share programs (car pool), and/or purchase of a bicycle.

Ever since the cancellation of AirCare, the government of British Columbia has been working on ways to make heavy-duty vehicles cleaner. They have come up with nine ways. First, the government retrofitted their heavy-duty vehicles and actively promote and use of biodiesel. Second, older models of transit buses were also retrofitted. The transit buses can run up to 30 years of service, even though new and better models come out it was wise to clean the older models so they can be reused. Third, the ministry of education invested $10 million to buy new cleaner school buses. Fourth, the government plans to expand the Aircare to more regions of the provinces for heavy-duty vehicles. Fifth, the government gave out incentives to have big diesels stop idling. Typical inner-city tracker trailers tend to sit idling for 1,800 hours a year, which is equivalent to approximately 75 days of wasting fuel, costing money and burning fuel into the atmosphere. So the government has been working to set up electric charge systems to stop the trailers from running on fuel. Sixth, the government will invest in green vehicle fleets. Green Fleets B.C. (GFBC) will be an important factor on the latest green technologies for private and public sectors. Such as the taxis, emergency vehicles, delivery vans and commercial fleet trucks. GFBC also forms part of the government's climate change strategy, which includes the reducing greenhouse gas emissions by 33% by 2020. Seventh, they will use biodiesel in government diesel vehicles. Biodiesel is reusable fuel that is made from fats and oils of animals and plants. It is often mixed with diesel fuel and can be used in any time that the diesel fuel can be used. Eighth, B.C. government will buy green. British Columbia's government is highly green friendly and is working to incorporate their strategies into buildings, vehicle fleets and the purchase or lease of other goods and services. Finally, the BC government is in Support with Greener ports and marine vessels. Vancouver's ports play a crucial role in the British Columbia's economy. As the ports in Vancouver' are an important asset to the government, the government will work in partnership with the ports and related organizations to test new ways to reduce emissions from port operations.

Government representatives have stated that they will pass: "A new greenhouse gas reduction regulation that offers incentives to utility companies for natural gas transportation fleets - including buses, trucks or ferries, as well as the creation and operation of compressed natural gas or liquefied natural gas fuelling stations."

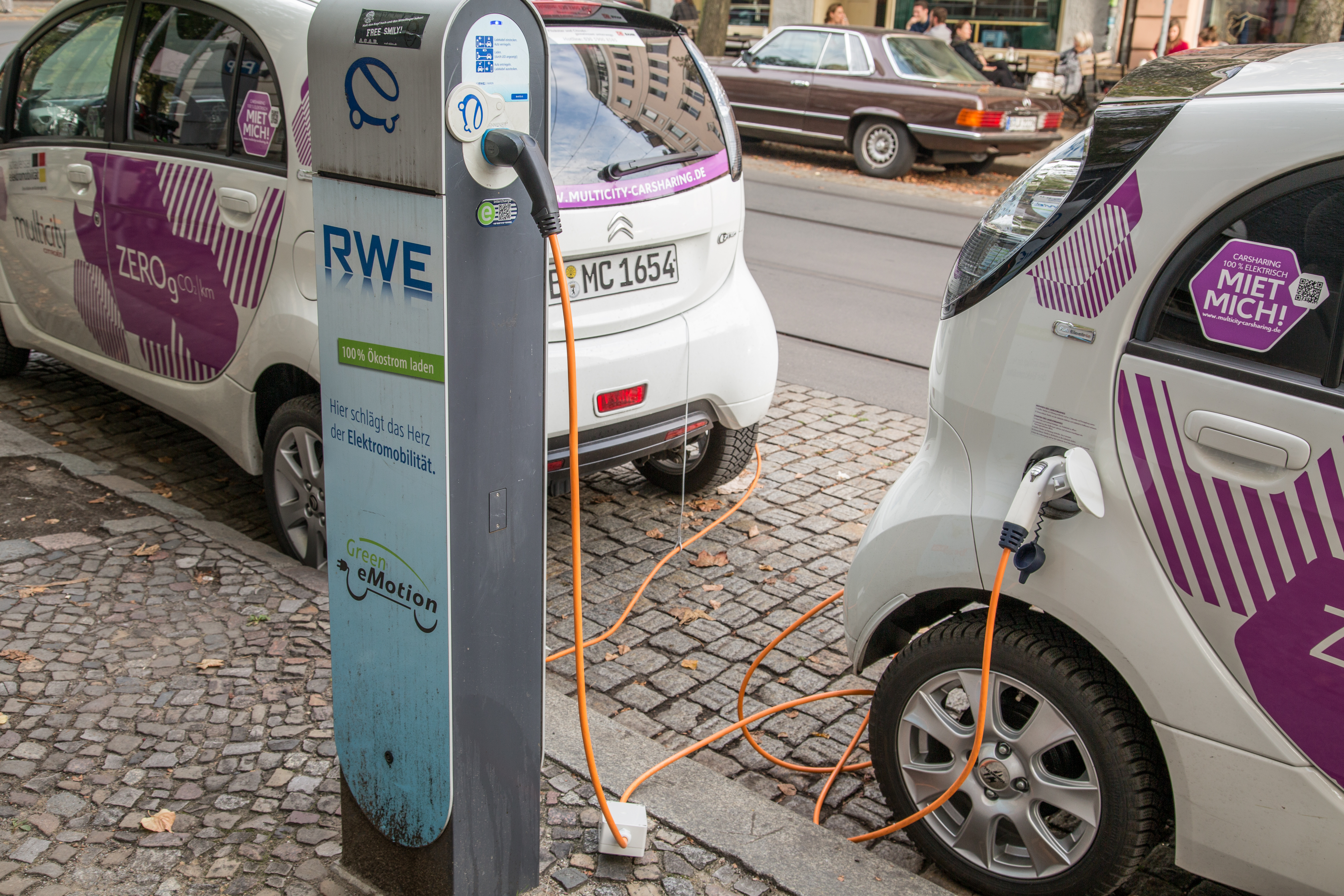
Car sharing with electric cars

A $2 million government investment to help the businesses exchange their heavy-duty diesel truck and equipment into more fuel efficient machines was set up as a low-interest loan program, which saved money and helped reduce carbon emissions. This plan is estimated to reduce 13,400 tones of emissions over the first three years. The long-term goal for this $17 million plan is to make cleaner energy vehicles, building, charging stations and BC SCRAP-IT society.

== See also ==
- TransLink
- Insurance Corporation of British Columbia (ICBC)
- BCAA
