= Vehicle registration plates of Canada =

Canada
- Country: Canada
- Country code: CDN

Current series
- Size: 12 in × 6 in 300 mm × 150 mm
- Serial format: Not standard

Vehicle registration plates of Canada, also known as licence plates, are issued by provincial or territorial government agencies. Registration plates in Canada are typically attached to motor vehicles or trailers for official identification purposes. Some Canadian registration plates have unique designs, shapes, and slogans related to the issuing jurisdiction. For example, registration plates issued in the Northwest Territories are shaped like a polar bear. In Alberta, registration plates typically display the words "Wild Rose Country."

British Columbia, Manitoba, and Ontario are the only Canadian jurisdictions that require both front and rear registration plates. The remaining jurisdictions do not require front registration plates. Most Canadian jurisdictions also issue "vanity licence plates," which allow drivers to customize the characters displayed.

Some provinces issue unique registration plates to persons with disabilities. These plates typically display the International Symbol of Access, and entitled drivers to parking privileges. The international code for Canadian plates is CDN.

== Designs and serial formats ==
In all provinces and the territory of Yukon, licence plate serials are alphanumeric and usually assigned in ascending order. The letters I, O, Q and U are generally not used to avoid confusion with 1, 0 and V; additionally, British Columbia does not use the letters Y and Z (except for motorcycle plates). The Northwest Territories and Nunavut use all-numeric serials, which are also assigned in ascending order.

Many jurisdictions distinguish their licence plates through distinctive colour schemes and logos. For example, Ontario's plates have featured a crown graphic since 1937 (except 1951), while Yukon's plates have featured a gold prospector graphic since 1952. The Northwest Territories' plates since 1970, and Nunavut's from 1999 to 2012, are cut in the shape of a polar bear, but meet the standardized mounting guidelines (below).

In every jurisdiction except Nunavut, the serial is embossed onto the plate. Nunavut's current rectangular plate, first issued in 2012, has the serial screened; the territory's previous bear-shaped plate had the serial embossed. Other identifying information, such as the name of the issuing jurisdiction and the vehicle class, can be either screened or embossed.

In 1956, the Canadian provinces and U.S. states came to an agreement with the American Association of Motor Vehicle Administrators, the Automobile Manufacturers Association and the National Safety Council that standardized the size for licence plates for vehicles (except those for motorcycles) at 150 mm (6 in) in height by 300 mm (12 in) in width, with standardized mounting holes. These figures may vary slightly by jurisdiction. Smaller-sized plates are used for motorcycles and, in some jurisdictions, mopeds and certain types of trailers and construction equipment.

== Showing current registration on plates ==
An example of a validation sticker for vehicle insurance issued in British Columbia

Historically, many Canadian plates were replaced every year, although the most common practise in modern times is to send new validation stickers to vehicle owners every year or two, to indicate that the vehicle registration is still valid.

Plates that are not up to date quickly attract the attention of law enforcement, because registration "renewal" is a transaction that can usually be undertaken only by the car's registered owner, once certain requirements have been met, and because registration fees are a source of government revenue. A delinquent registration sticker is often an indicator that the vehicle may be stolen, that the vehicle's owner has failed to comply with the applicable law regarding emission inspection or insurance, or that the vehicle's owner has unpaid traffic or parking tickets. Even with the stickers, most provinces previously required that all licence plates be replaced every few years; that practise is being abandoned by many provinces because of the expense of continually producing large numbers of plates.

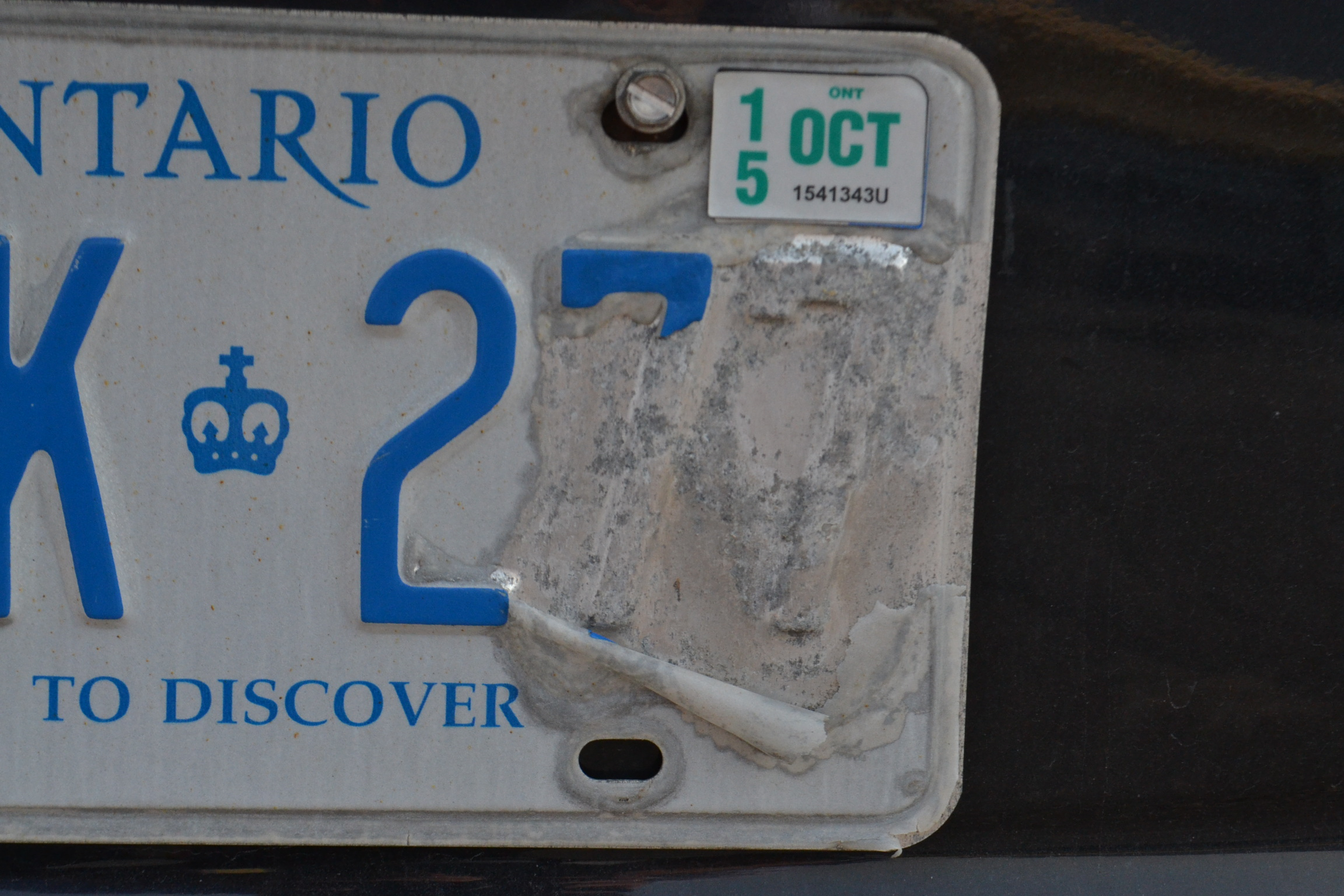
A damaged Ontario licence plate, with its validation stickers placed on the upper right-hand corner

The sticker is usually placed on one corner of the plate, while the month of the year in which the plate would expire is printed in an opposing corner. Some jurisdictions combine the year and month on one sticker. In others, the plate's validation is a decal displayed from the inside of the windshield. The colour of plate stickers and windshield decals often changes annually, to allow for easier detection by police. Quebec no longer issues plate stickers and has not done so since 1992. Saskatchewan stopped issuing the stickers on November 1, 2012, as a cost-saving measure. British Columbia no longer issues insurance decals and allows motorists to remove existing and expired decals from their licence plates as of May 1, 2022.

Most validation stickers are either serialized (with the serial number recorded on the registration), or are printed by a special printer at the time of registration or renewal with the vehicle's licence plate number on them to discourage fraudulent sticker use, as the sticker will be valid only for the plate for which it was intended.

Currently, Alberta, British Columbia, Manitoba, Newfoundland and Labrador, Ontario, Quebec, Saskatchewan, and Yukon are jurisdictions in which decals are not used. Instead, the police rely on the use of cameras and computers that automatically report any plates for which the registration is expired (making the use of fake stickers obsolete), the car has been reported as stolen and/or similar reasons. That said, the vehicle registration certificate is the only way for the owner to prove that a vehicle has valid registration.

== Temporary permits ==
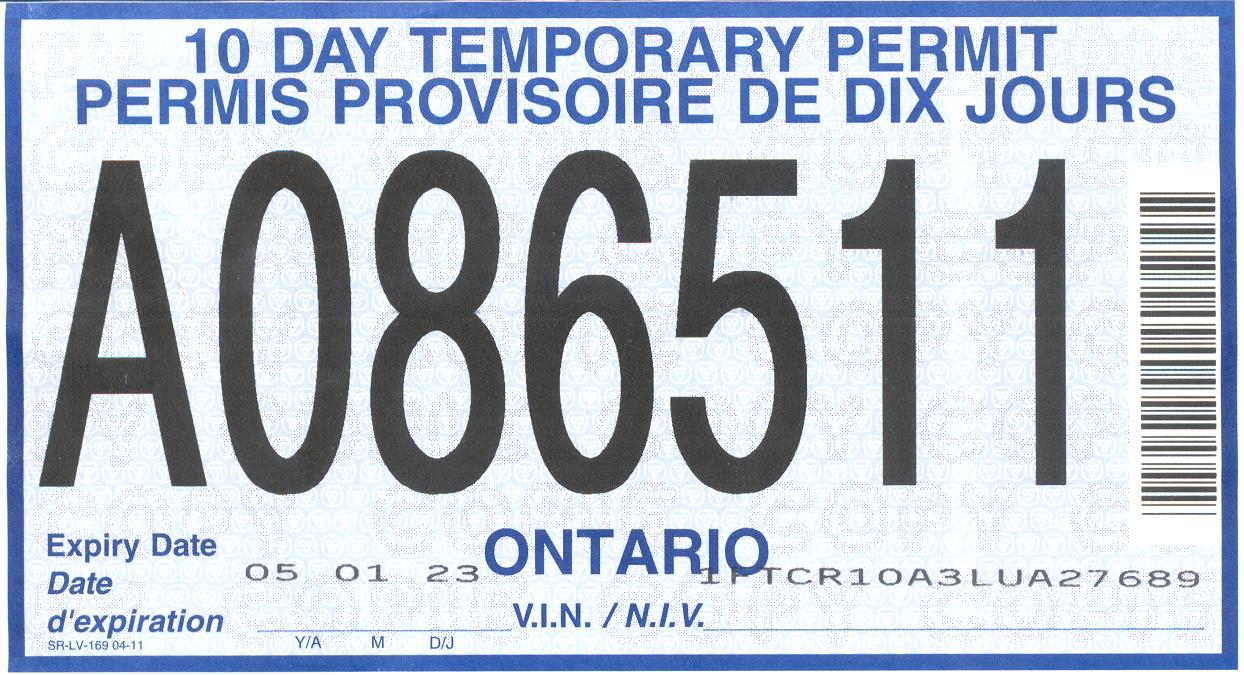
A temporary licence plate issued in Ontario

Each and every province issues temporary licence plates differently.

Ontario issues 10-day temporary permits, available up to twice in a 365-day period, when a licence holder purchases a used vehicle, as long as the vehicle was legally registered as 'Fit' with the previous owner. An 'Unfit' vehicle (has not passed safety standards with the previous owner) can not be issued a temporary permit. If a vehicle passes safety standards inspection, but does not pass emissions testing it may be issued up to four 10-day temporary permits. As of 2008, Ontario issues regular licence plates with a registration sticker that is labelled "T" to owners of recently purchased used vehicles. Classic vehicles (older than 25 model years) use the paper printed window temporary plate (as pictured in this article).

In Alberta, temporary permits are not issued. Instead, the licence plate is issued the day of registration from a registry.

In British Columbia, the Insurance Corporation of British Columbia (ICBC) issues 15-day permits to people who purchase a vehicle on the province's territory. These cost $60 and consist of a piece of paper which will be attached to the windshield of the vehicle. The permits include insurance since auto insurance in British Columbia is not privatized but brokerage is, so they are obtained through Autoplan brokers. For British Columbia residents purchasing a vehicle elsewhere in Canada or in the United States, temporary insurance can be obtained from ICBC over the phone, being one of the few times one deals with ICBC directly.

The situation in Manitoba and Saskatchewan is similar.

== Life cycle ==
Plates typically stay with the owner rather than the vehicle, and motorists usually transfer plates from their previous vehicle to the new one as a cost-saving measure. For this reason, in Ontario it is possible to see a brand new vehicle with valid 1973-issue licence plates, while a 15-year-old vehicle may have brand new plates if there were no previous plates to transfer.

In Newfoundland and Labrador plates typically stay with the vehicle and the registration transferred between owners, with new plates being issued to new vehicles. Exceptions include veteran, fire fighter, and amateur radio operator plates.

In Ontario, motorists may apply to transfer licence plates with the approval of the provincial Ministry of Transportation under special circumstances, such as from one immediate family member to another. Motorists may also purchase year of manufacture plates for classic vehicles up to the plate issuing year of 1973 in accordance with the terms and conditions of the Ministry of Transportation of Ontario

Various provinces have different schemes for reissuing licence plates, a process known as "replating." In some jurisdictions, plates are issued on a permanent basis and are not replaced unless the owner requests a new plate or that their existing plate be remade. These jurisdictions include New Brunswick and Ontario. Other jurisdictions replate on a rolling basis, replacing a particular motorist's plate when it reaches a certain age. Yet other jurisdictions may recall a particular series of plates for reissuance at regular or irregular intervals. This is particularly common in jurisdictions in which only one licence plate series or design is valid at any given time. Optional-issue plates may or may not follow the same rules for replacement as standard-issue plates, depending on the jurisdiction.

== Mounting ==
Licence plate mounting requirements in Canada Only rear plates required Front and rear plates required

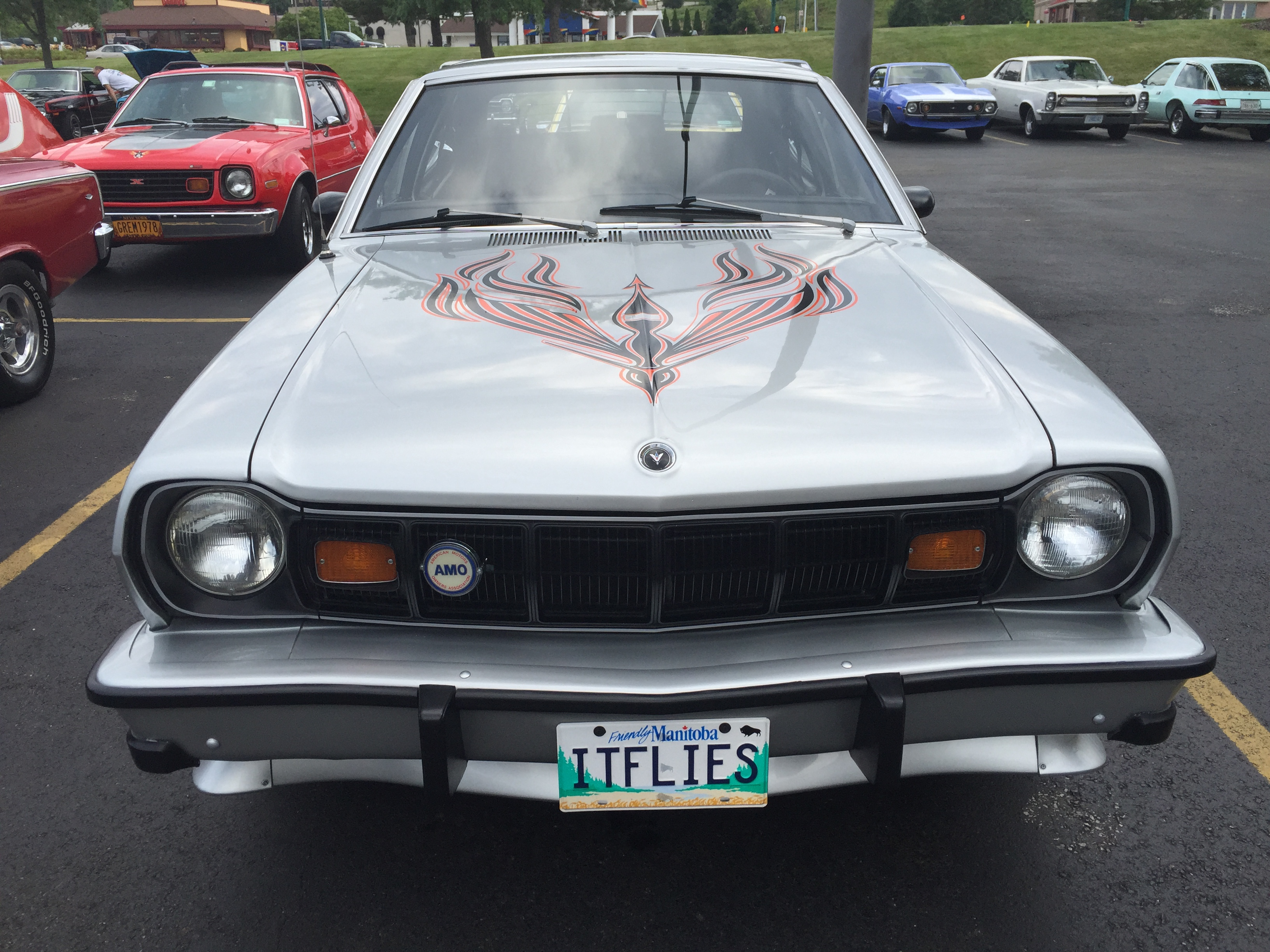
An AMC Hornet with a Manitoba licence plate mounted on its front. Manitoba is one of three provinces (British Columbia and Ontario being the others) in which both front and rear licence plates are required. This particular licence plate is also a vanity plate.

In the provinces of Alberta, New Brunswick, Newfoundland and Labrador, Nova Scotia, Prince Edward Island, Quebec, and Saskatchewan, and the territories of Northwest Territories, Nunavut, and Yukon, licence plates are currently only required on the rear of most vehicles. The remaining provinces, British Columbia, Manitoba, and Ontario, require the licence plates to be mounted on both the front and rear of the vehicle. Dealership plate frames or custom plate frames are allowed as long as the frame does not obstruct view of validation stickers or district.

== Vanity and speciality plates ==
In each province but Newfoundland and Labrador, motorists are given the option of extra-cost vanity plates (also known as "personalised" or "prestige" plates), which are licence plates with a custom serial (sequence of letters and/or numbers). Generally vanity plates are not permitted to have profane or obscene messages on them, although standards vary widely among issuing jurisdictions as to what constitutes an unacceptable message.

In some jurisdictions, vehicle owners may also pay extra for speciality plates. With these, the plate serial is chosen by the licensing agency—as with regular plates—but the owners select a plate design that is different from the normal licence plate. For example, an alumnus or student of an area university might purchase a plate with the school's logo, or a sports enthusiast might decide to pay extra for a plate depicting their favourite team. A portion of the extra cost of these licence plates often ends up as a donation for a related school or non-profit organization. In 1996 the province of Ontario issued an optional Star Trek licence plate. It was discontinued in the early 2000s. Some jurisdictions allow for some or all of their speciality plates to also be vanity plates, usually for an additional fee on top of the cost of the plate.

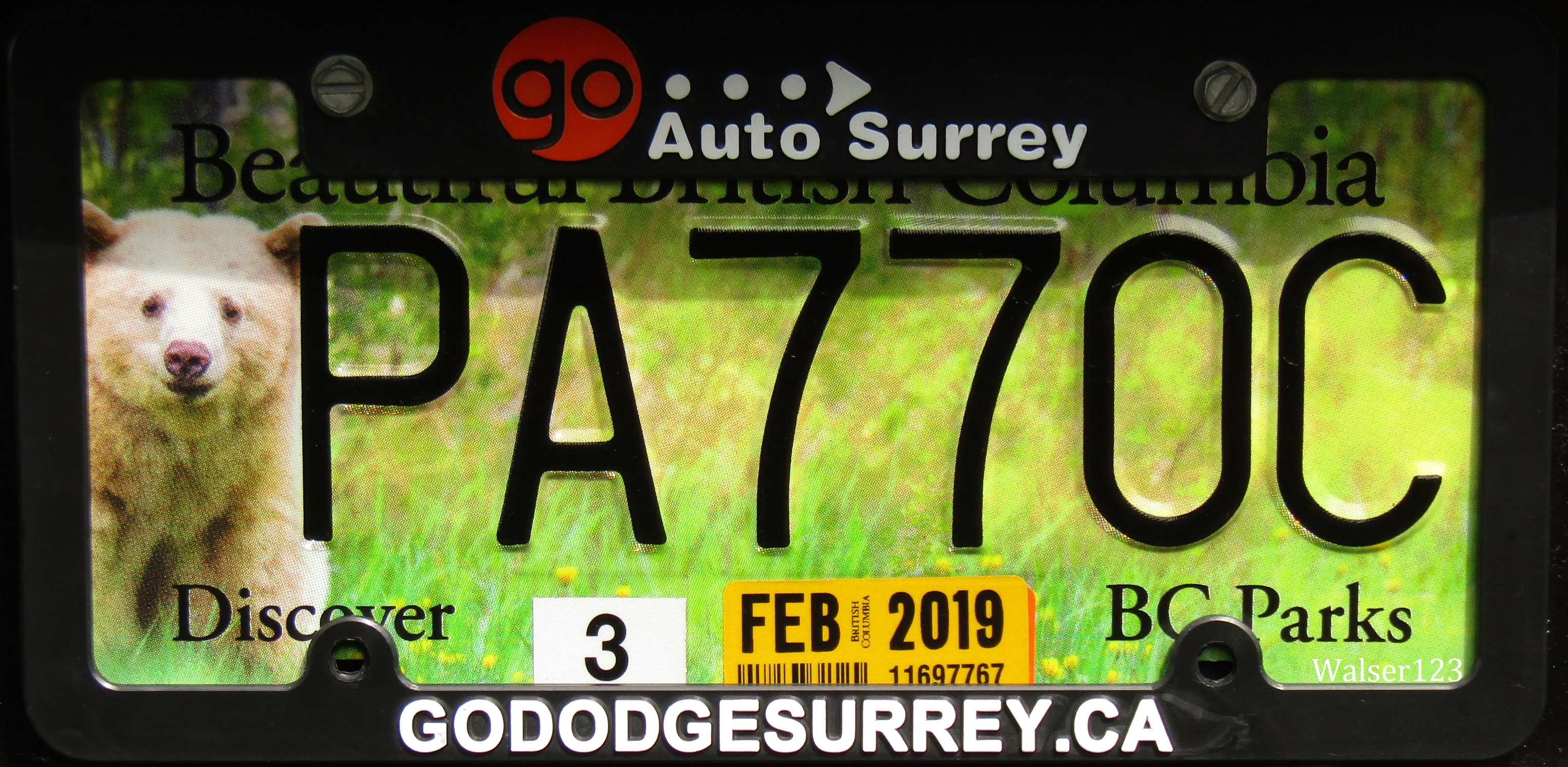
A vanity plate issued in British Columbia

Beginning in 2010, Saskatchewan issued speciality plates in celebration of the Saskatchewan Roughriders' centennial. The plates feature the slogan "Pride Lives Here." Plates in the first series begin with an R, followed by four digits (R####); subsequent series begin with a digit, then an R, then three digits (#R###). These plates are also available as five character vanity plates for an additional fee. In the first sixteen months, 22,000 Roughrider plates were issued, resulting in $585,000 profit for the football club. In 2012, SGI made Rider plates available for motorcycles and snowmobiles.

Veterans are allowed to have a special veteran's licence plate.

In addition, provinces may provide commemorative plates as a standard issue. A number of provinces issued plates recognizing the 1967 centennial of the Canadian Confederation during that year. Several provinces have issued plates commemorating milestones in their own province. Provinces often issue plates with their motto or slogan, such as Quebec's "Je me souviens", British Columbia's "Beautiful British Columbia." or Ontario's "Yours To Discover". These are arguably also general commemoratives. Saskatchewan's "Land of Living Skies" slogan may be interpreted as a reference to the province's drastically changing weather within minutes or a nod to the northern lights, aurora borealis.

All provinces offer specialized licence plates for licensed amateur radio operators, in many cases at no extra charge or at a discount compared to standard vanity plates. The owner's radio call sign is used instead of a standard-issue serial.

In preparation for the 2010 Winter Olympics held in Vancouver, the province of British Columbia and the Insurance Corporation of British Columbia issued special "Olympic" registration plates. The special plates feature an image of the mountain peaks of Garibaldi Provincial Park as the background, with the Vancouver 2010 logo in the foreground between the letter and number groups of the registration plate. The plates were optional, requiring an initial fee of $35.00, as well as a yearly renewal fee of $25.00 per year. These "Olympic Plates" were only offered until December 31, 2010, however owners may continue to display them on their vehicle.

On November 17, 2018, the province of Alberta announced Edmonton Oilers and Calgary Flames licence plates for $75 with $55 of each purchase going to the charity of the selected team, the Edmonton Oilers Community Foundation and the Calgary Flames Foundation, respectively. Alberta also has a "Support our Troops" licence plate that has been available since July 22, 2014 with most of the money going to the Support our Troops program.

== Jurisdiction ==
=== Armed Forces ===
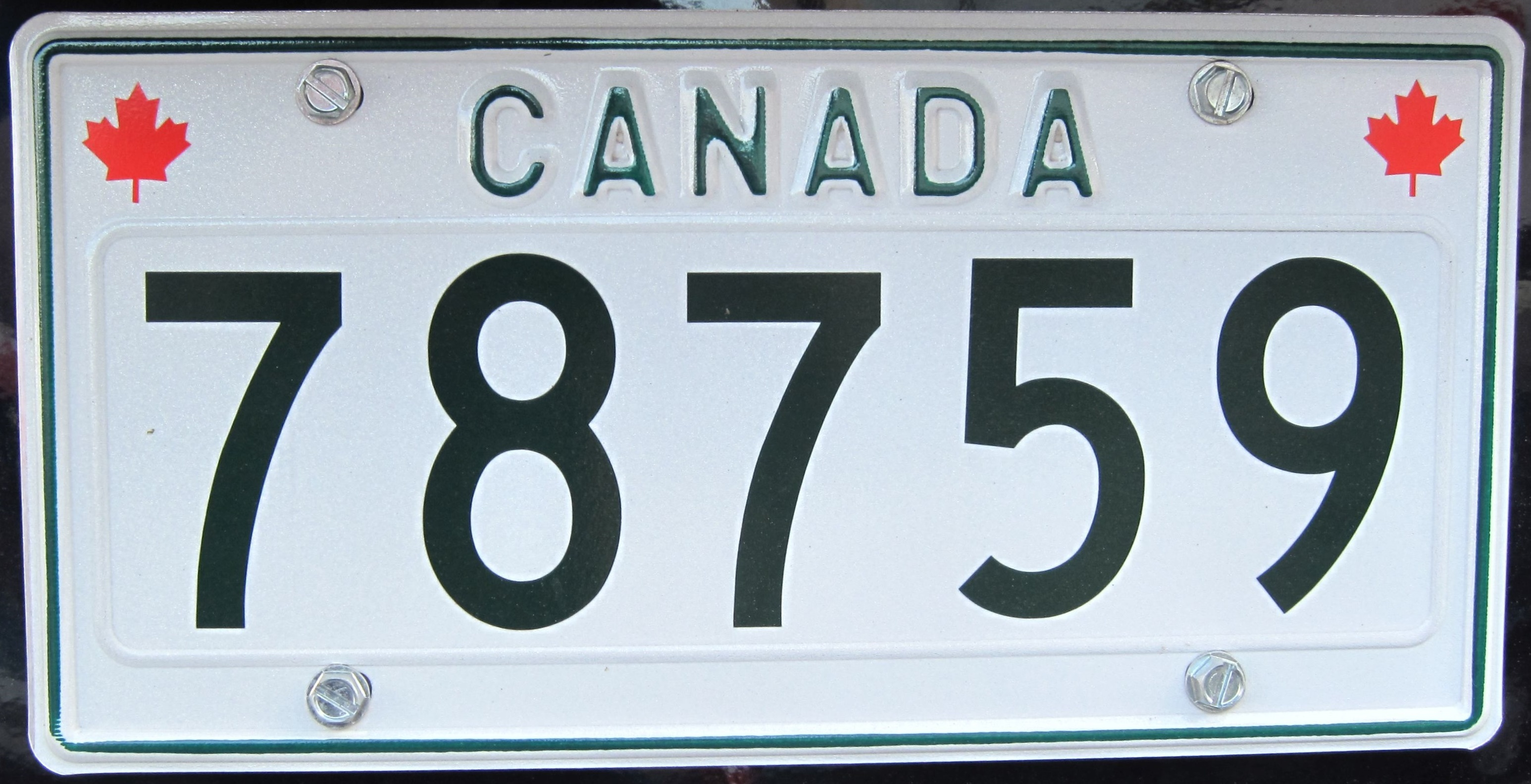
Licence plates used by the Department of National Defence

Vehicles owned by the Canadian Armed Forces and the Department of National Defence are specially plated, and authorized for movement on all highways and roads. Called a "Canadian Forces Registration" (CFR), these licence plates are white with a green border and the text "Canada" written on them at the top in green, with a red maple leaf on either side of the text at the top. Licence plates show only the CFR's last five numbers for vehicles and for trailers. The full CFR number also included a 2 digit prefix (followed by a dash) that reflected the last 2 digits in the year of manufacture of the vehicle. These plates also do not bear any form of validation tag / sticker, as there is no need for annual renewal.

Canadian Armed Forces licence plates
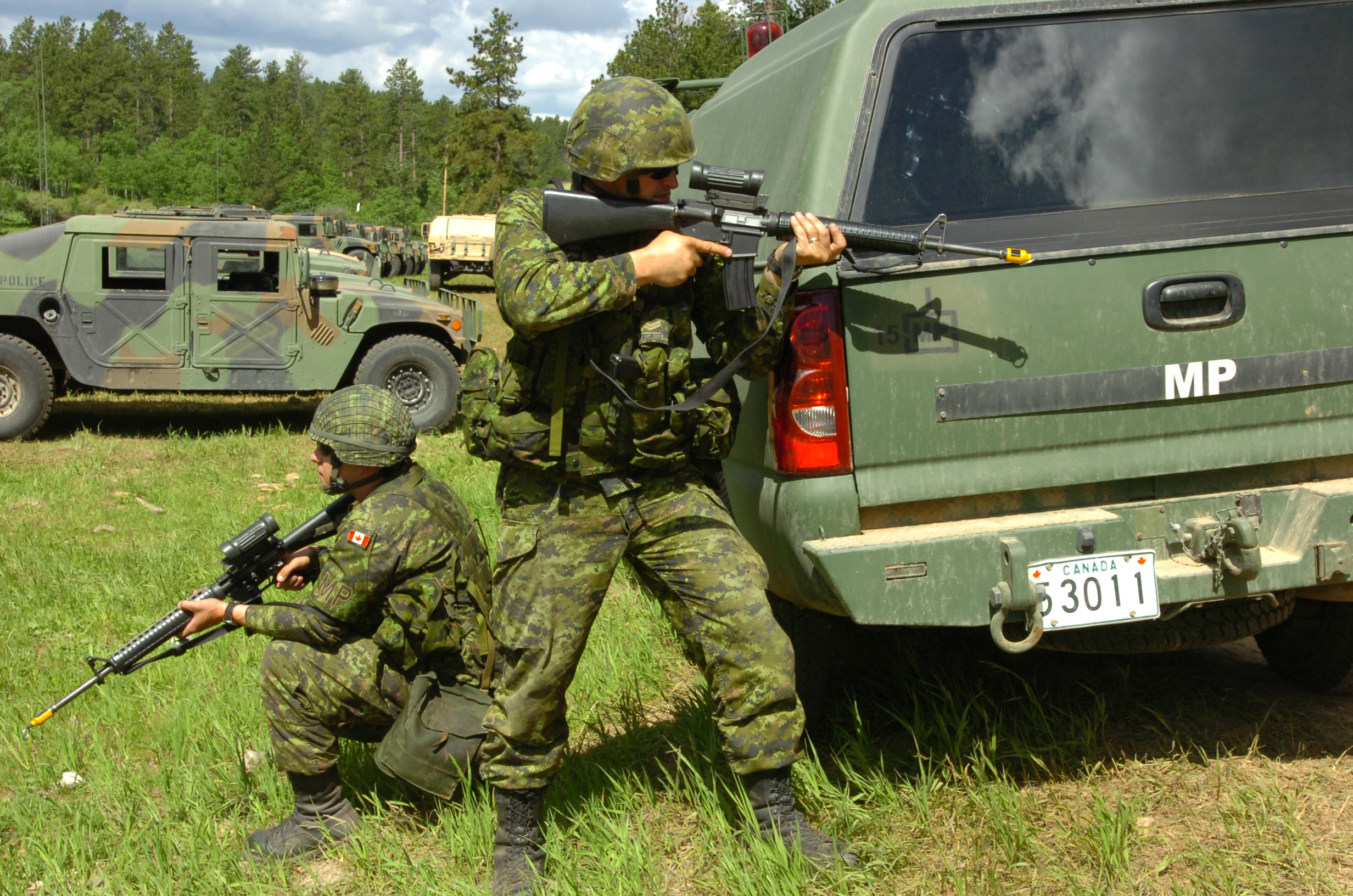
Canadian military police

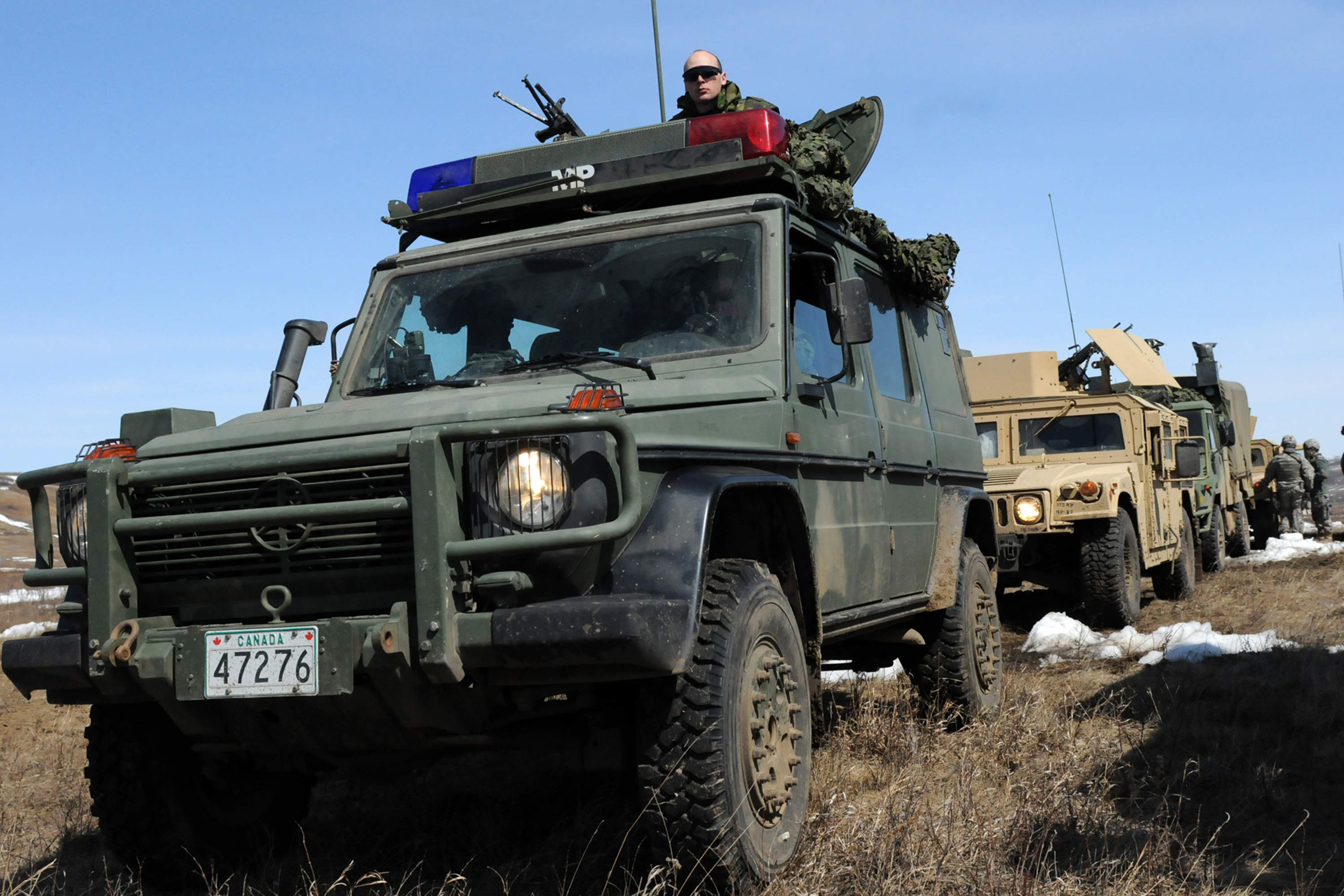
Canadian 1 Military Police Platoon

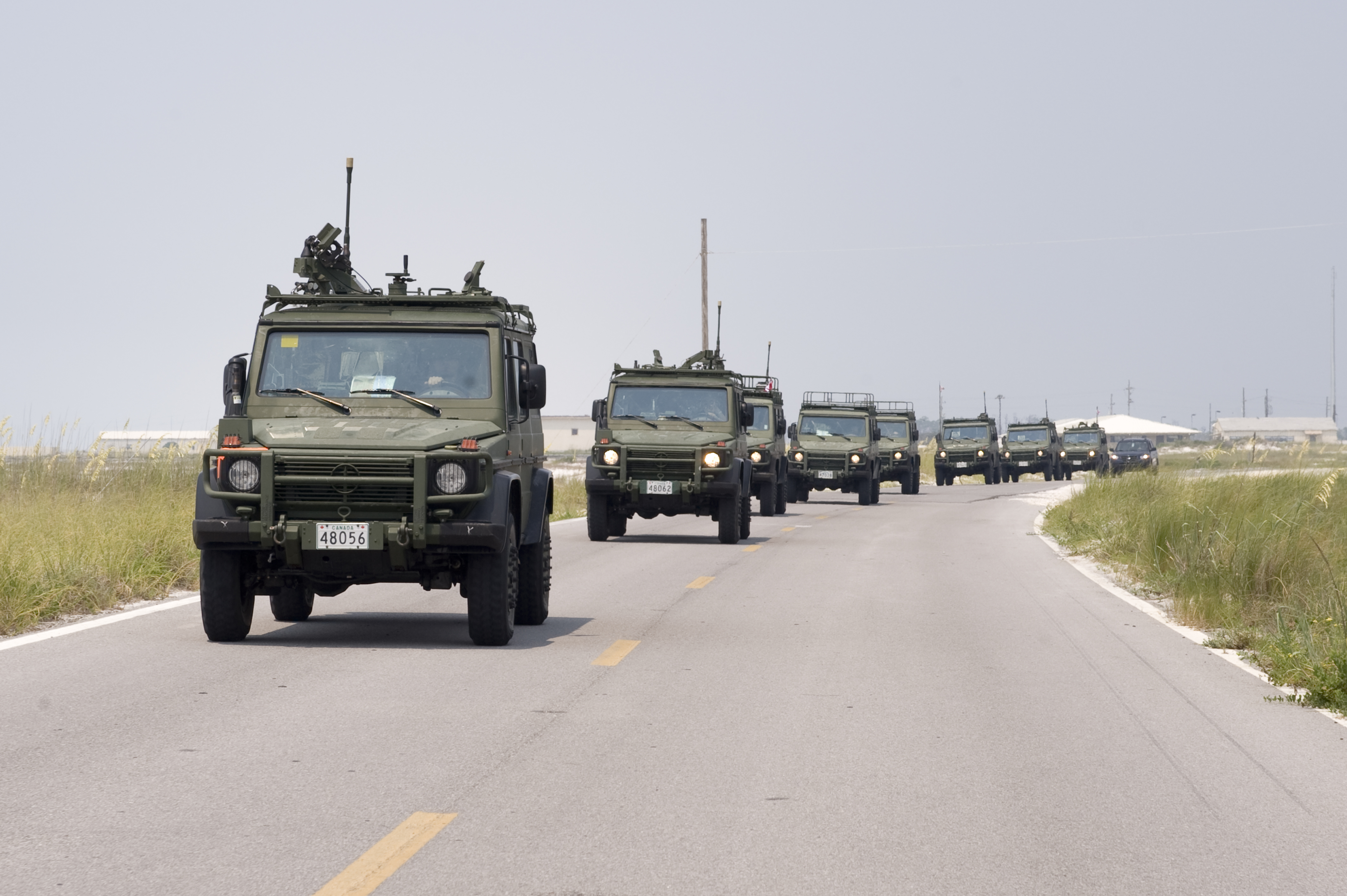
Canadian Land Forces Command

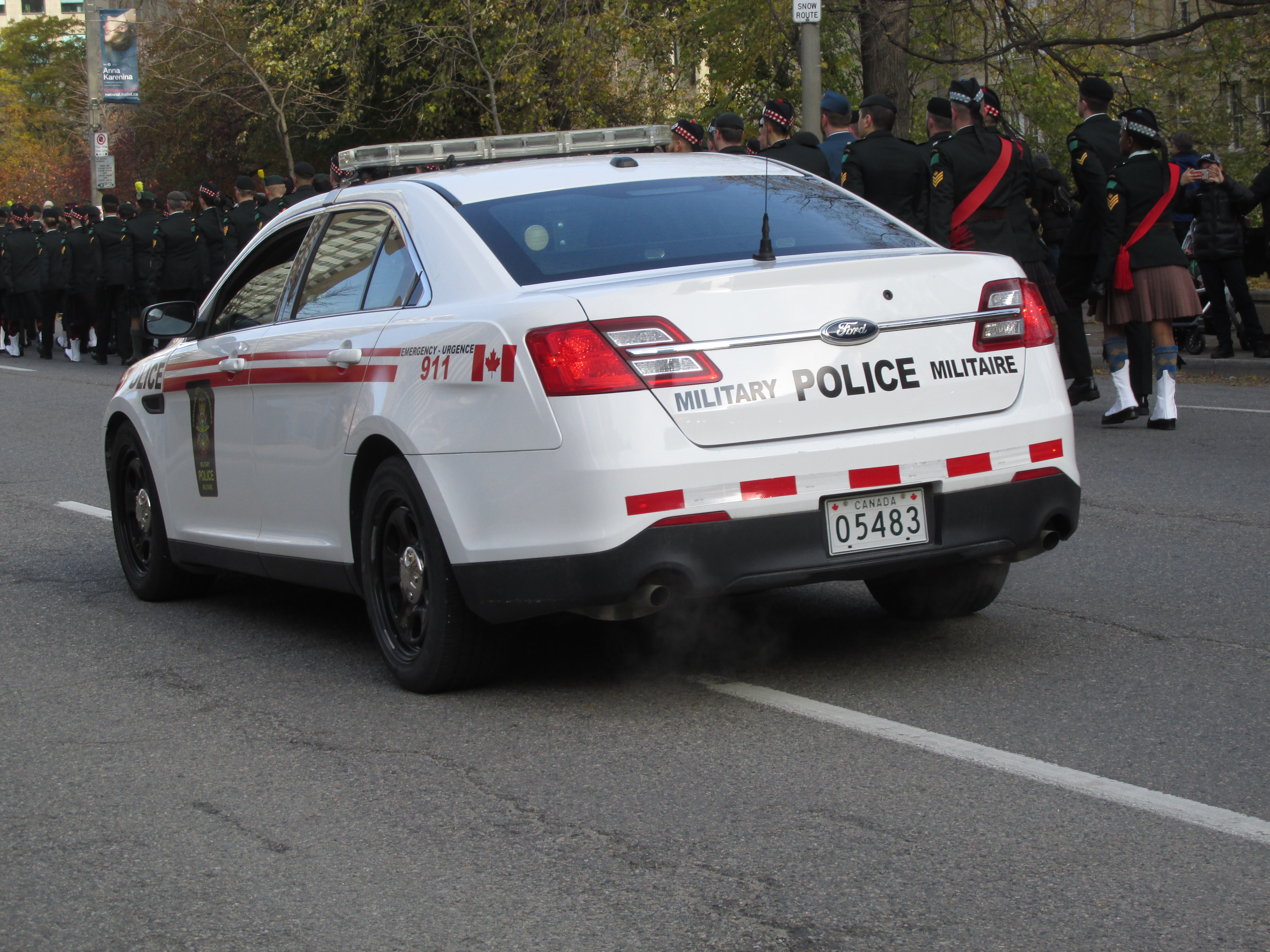
Canadian Forces Military Police Ford Taurus Sedan, federal licence plate 05483

=== Royal and viceregal automobiles ===
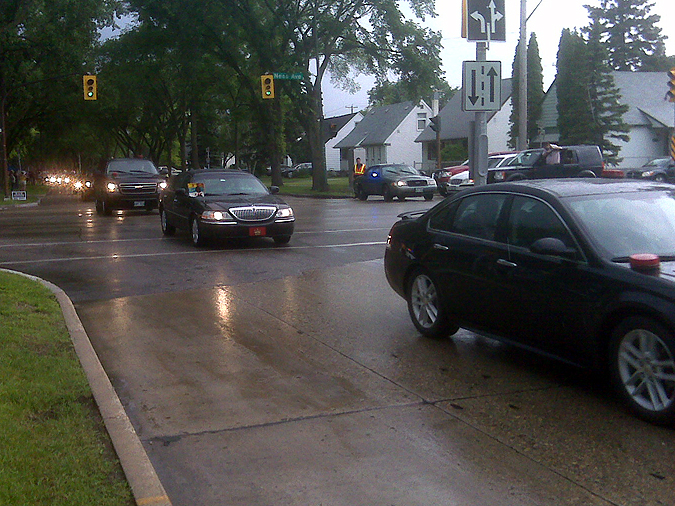
Motorcade for Elizabeth II during her 2010 royal tour. The licence plate for the car carrying the Queen features St Edward's Crown on a red field.

When in Canada, the monarch of Canada is driven in an official car that bears a licence plate with a gold St Edward's Crown on a red field. The governor general's vehicle bears a standard licence plate of the province of Ontario, but the vehicle displays the governor general's flag to distinguish it.

=== British Columbia ===
The official vehicle for the Lieutenant Governor of British Columbia does not have a licence plate and instead, an embossed coat of arms of British Columbia is affixed to the plate area. Official government vehicles do not use distinct licence plate or numbers unlike other provinces within this section of the article.

=== Ontario ===
Cars owned by the Government of Canada in Ontario are in the format FDx-123, not in the usual four-letter format, with the first two letters always being "F" and "D" and the third digit being either a letter or a number. Cars owned by the provincial government of Ontario use standard series plates, but with specialized validation stickers exempt from annual registration. These exempt stickers are yellow with black stripes, informally dubbed bumblebee stickers. Ontario plates assigned to Members of Parliament are in the format of MHC-123 for members of the House of Commons and SEN-123 for senators. Members of the Canadian Cabinet receive CAN-123 plates, with the Prime Minister assigned CAN-001 and remaining members of cabinet assigned numbers sequentially based on order of precedence. Federal court judges receive FCJ-123. Ontario Superior Court judges receive SCO-123.

The Lieutenant Governor of Ontario receives licence plates that bear an embossed crown rather than a number. members of Provincial Parliament receive MPP-123 plates. Members of the Executive Council of Ontario (Cabinet of Ontario) receive ONT-123 plates, with the premier assigned ONT-001 and remaining members of cabinet assigned numbers sequentially based on order of precedence. Provincial judges receive PJO-123.

=== New Brunswick ===
Cars and pickup trucks owned by the province of New Brunswick also use standard series plates, but with black "Permanent" validation stickers exempt from annual registration.

Municipally owned vehicles larger than a pickup truck receive plates that begin with M, in the format M12-345.

Diplomatic plates are in the format of DP-123.

The Lieutenant Governor of New Brunswick receives a licence plate that bears an embossed crown.

=== Newfoundland and Labrador ===
All government vehicles (including construction equipment and trailers) in Newfoundland and Labrador are issued plates that begin with G. Depending on the level of government the plate format can be GFx-123 for federal vehicles, GPx-123 for provincial, and GMx-123 for municipal.

Government vehicles in Newfoundland and Labrador do not display registration stickers.

=== Nunavut ===
As of 2012, vehicles owned by members of the Legislative Assembly of Nunavut receive plates in the format of MLA-123.

=== Saskatchewan ===
The Lieutenant Governor of Saskatchewan receives licence plates that bear an embossed crown rather than a number. Official government vehicles do not use distinct licence plate or numbers unlike other provinces within this section of the article. Federal government vehicles are issued "vehicle class" stickers bearing the letters "GC."

== General registration licence plates ==
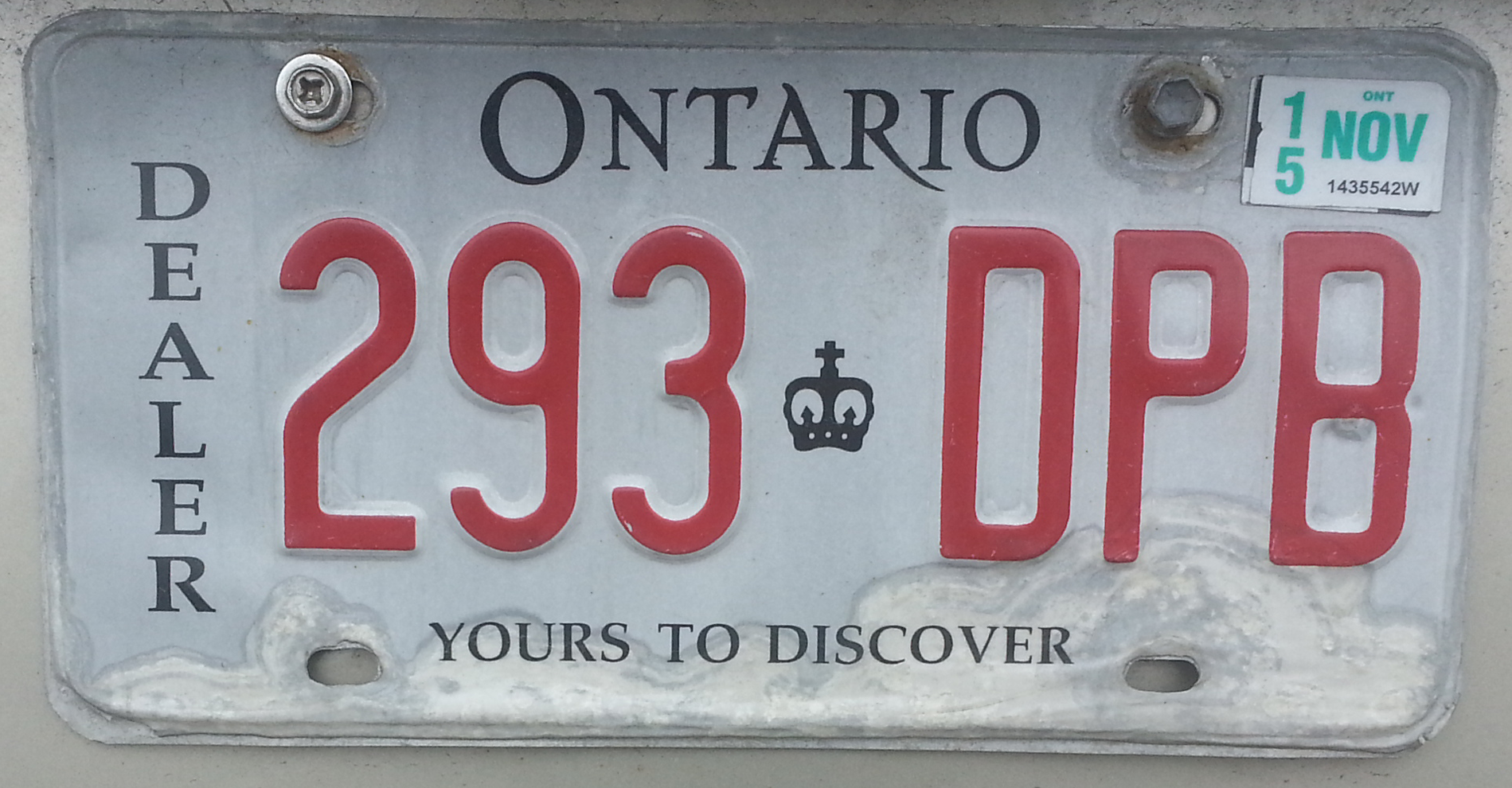
A motor vehicle dealers licence plate issued in Ontario

In Ontario, motor vehicle dealers licensed under the Motor Vehicle Dealers Act use a single portable plate with the word "DEALER" on the left side and red alpha-numeric characters on a white background. It is for exclusive use by motor vehicle dealers only on motor vehicles owned as part of the dealer's inventory of vehicles for sale. It may also be used for private use vehicles that are owned as part of the dealer's inventory of vehicles for sale. The dealer, his/her family or the employee of the dealership or the employee's family may also use such a vehicle for private use.

Quebec has a similar way of dealing with things. Plate numbers with the prefix "X" followed by five or six digits may be used on any vehicle that is part of a dealer's inventory.

Service providers, including anyone who repairs, customises, modifies, manufactures or transports motor vehicles or trailers use yellow and black DLR series plates (Dealer and Service Plate).

A Service Plate may be used:

- on a trailer or motor vehicle other than a motorcycle or motor-assisted bicycle for purposes related to the repair, road testing, customisation or modification of the vehicle, if the vehicle is in the possession of the person to whom the service plate is issued, or
- for the purpose of transporting the vehicle by a person engaged in the business of transporting vehicles, or
- for purposes related to the manufacturing or sale of a trailer, or
- for the purpose of towing the vehicle by a person engaged in the business of transporting vehicles, or
- to tow a vehicle to a location where its load will be removed or to an impound facility.

Private use of motor vehicles or trailers with a service plate is not permitted.

British Columbia Demonstration (dealer) plates: Similar regulations are in place. These can only be used by employees of the dealership for use pertaining to the dealership.

British Columbia Transporter plates are used by legal entities to transport non-owned vehicles with a written contract.

British Columbia Manufacturer plates are used by auto makers.

== Diplomatic licence plates ==
The diplomatic plates are issued by the province in which the consulate or embassy is located. Thus, most plates are issued in Ontario, where the capital Ottawa is located.

=== British Columbia ===
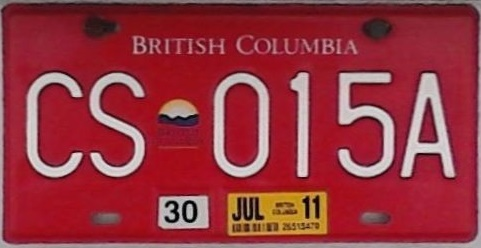
Diplomatic licence plate issued in British Columbia

The provincial government introduced new vehicle plate template for consular officials in 2006. The plates are red background (contrast with blue or white background for regular plates) and white lettering. These plates do not have slogans such as "Beautiful British Columbia" or "Best Place on Earth" that appear on plates for regular plates.

Format of the plates are XX ###X where XX can be CC (Consular Officers), HC (Honorary Consuls), CS (Administrative, service or technical staff) and SR (sub-state foreign officials), followed by 3 numbers and a letter.

=== Ontario ===
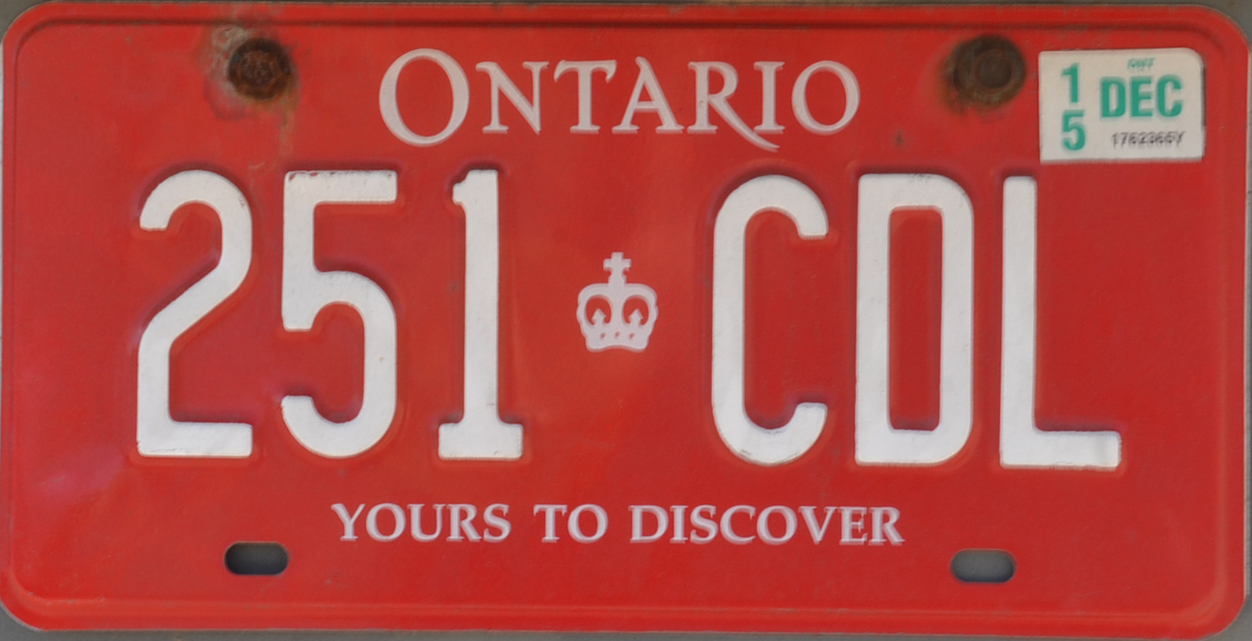
Diplomatic licence plate issued in Ontario

Ontario plates are colour-coded. Car, motorcycle and trailer plates use blue letters on a white background. Commercial vehicle, bus and farm plates use black on white; diplomat plates are white on red; dealer plates are red on white; service plates are black on yellow; and green plates are for electric vehicles and have a 3-number, 3-letter format, coded as follows:

- CDx = Diplomat
- CCx = Consular
- XTx = Non Diplomatic Embassy Staff
- XOR = Foreign missions without diplomatic status.

Ambassadors or Heads of Missions use plates in the 010 to 019 number series, i.e., starting at 010-CDA. The Taipei Economic and Cultural Representative Office is the main user of XOR plates.

=== Saskatchewan ===
Saskatchewan Consular Corps plates maintain the colour scheme of standard plates (green on white). "Land of Living Skies" is replaced with "Consular Corps." The plates have a 2-letter, 3-number format. CC is used by consular vehicles.

=== Quebec ===
Mission holders based in Quebec have a unique format. Plates are XXX ### where XXX can be Y27 (Canadian Diplomat Officers with Mission), Y28 (Foreign Diplomat Officers with Mission), Y29 (Generic Mission Holders), followed by 3 numbers and or letters. The sum of the letters and numbers is a validation. These licence plates are only valid for 3 months and can be renewed.

== See also ==
- Vehicle registration plates of the United States
- Vehicle registration plates of Alberta
