= Saskatchewan Government Insurance =

Canadian insurance company

- Type: Crown corporation
- Industry: Insurance, driver licensing, motor vehicle registration
- Founded: 1945; 81 years ago
- Headquarters: C.M. Fines Building; Regina, Saskatchewan,
- Key people: Honourable Don Morgan, Minister Responsible for SGI; Penny McCune, President and Chief Executive Officer (CEO)
- Owner: Government of Saskatchewan
- Number of employees: 2,400
- Parent: Crown Investments Corporation
- Divisions: Saskatchewan Auto Fund; SGI Canada
- Subsidiaries: Coachman Insurance Company
- Website: www.sgi.sk.ca

Saskatchewan Government Insurance (SGI) is a Canadian insurance company and a Crown corporation wholly owned by the Government of Saskatchewan. SGI's operations consist of the Saskatchewan Auto Fund, the compulsory public auto insurance program for Saskatchewan, and its property and casualty insurance division sells additional automobile and property insurance products in five Canadian provinces under the trade name SGI Canada.

SGI also operates the driver licensing and motor vehicle registration system for Saskatchewan as part of its oversight of the Auto Fund. The Auto Fund is financially self-sustaining, operating on a break-even basis over time. The Saskatchewan Auto Fund does not receive money from or pay dividends to the government.

Under the SGI Canada brand, SGI sells property and casualty insurance on properties such as homes, farms, businesses and automobile insurance in five Canadian provinces. It operates as SGI Canada in Saskatchewan; SGI Canada Insurance Services Ltd. in Manitoba, Alberta, British Columbia, Ontario; and Coachman Insurance Company in Ontario.

== History ==
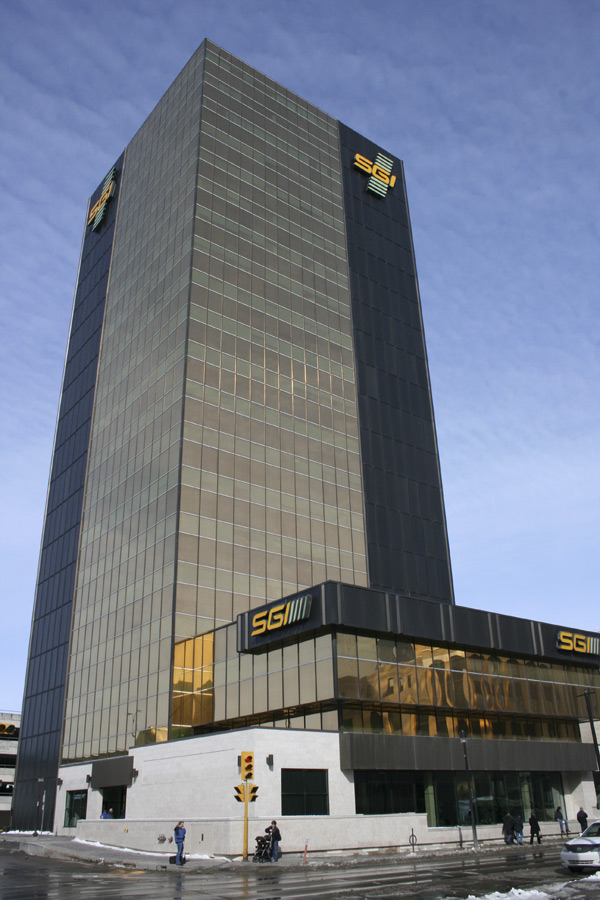
C.M. Fines Building - SGI Head Office in downtown Regina, Saskatchewan, Canada

SGI was created by the first avowedly socialist government in North America elected in 1944, the Co-operative Commonwealth Federation (later renamed New Democratic Party). Under Premier Tommy Douglas, the government began to involve itself in many sectors of the economy, including insurance. The rationale was put forth that Saskatchewan residents were being taken advantage of by companies owned outside the province who set rates too high. Also, at least 90 per cent of the insurance in the province was written by companies established in Eastern Canada. Thus the institution of a publicly owned insurance company was justified by the government on both philosophical and economic grounds.

Working out of the Saskatchewan Legislative Building, Michael Allore, the first president, sold the first policy – Fire Policy Number 1 – to Minister O. W. Valleau on May 1, 1945, and appointed its first broker, Oscar Sawby of Maple Creek, on May 17. By the end of 1945, SGI had 60 employees and a small network of private, independent insurance brokers located across the province selling insurance on behalf of the corporation.

The introduction of a state-run automobile insurance was controversial. For the first few years of its existence, other provinces refused to recognize SGI policies as legitimate. One result of such non-recognition was that SGI-insured drivers involved in a collision in Manitoba were either detained or required to post a bond because Manitoban authorities essentially considered them to be "uninsured" drivers.

List of SGI Presidents
#	President	Took position	Left position
1	Michael Allore	1945	1953
2	Herbert Hammond	1953	1965
3	Jim Dutton	1965	1972
4	John Green	1973	1980
5	Murray Wallace	1981	1982
6	Don Black	1983	1985
7	Alex Wilde	1985	1991
8	Bill Heidt	1992	1994
9	John Wright	1995	1997
10	Larry Fogg	1997	2004
11	Jon Schubert	2004	2008
12	Earl Cameron	2008	2009
13	Andrew Cartmell	2009	2022
14	Jeff Stepan	2022	2022
15	Penny McCune	2022	present

== Corporate governance ==
SGI and SGI CANADA are governed by The Saskatchewan Government Insurance Act, 1980, and The Automobile Accident Insurance Act, and are subject to the provisions of The Crown Corporations Act, 1993, which gives the Crown Investments Corporation, the holding company for Saskatchewan's commercial Crown corporations, the broad authority to set the direction of the corporation.

Where required by legislation or policy directive, SGI submits performance management and investment decisions for review and approval by CIC and the provincial cabinet (government). Through its chair, who is an outside director, the SGI Board of Directors is accountable to the Minister Responsible for SGI. The minister functions as a link between the corporation and CIC and cabinet, as well as the provincial legislature.

== Board of directors ==
The board of directors is responsible for setting direction, monitoring and reporting achievement, and analyzing, evaluating and taking corrective action for the corporation. The board is responsible for the stewardship of the corporation in general terms. In meeting this responsibility, the board works with management to develop and approve the corporation's strategic plan, operating goals, annual budget and business plans. It participates in identifying business risk and overseeing the implementation of appropriate systems to achieve a balance between the risks incurred and potential returns.

The board of directors is appointed by the Lieutenant Governor in Council. The board consists of ten external directors. Both the chair and vice-chair of the board are external directors.

== Structure and functions ==
SGI employs approximately 2,400 people and works with a network of almost 300 independent insurance brokers and about 450 motor licence issuers in Saskatchewan, as well as numerous brokers in Alberta, British Columbia, Manitoba and Ontario.

In October 2008, SGI was named one of "Canada's Top 100 Employers" by Mediacorp Canada Inc., and was featured in Maclean's newsmagazine. Later that month, SGI was named one of Saskatchewan's Top Employers, which was announced by the Saskatoon StarPhoenix and Regina Leader-Post newspapers.

SGI's head office is in downtown Regina, Saskatchewan. It also operates 20 claims centres in 13 Saskatchewan communities, has branch offices in Winnipeg, Edmonton and Toronto, and five salvage locations (auto wrecker, used parts).

== See also ==
- Vehicle registration plates of Saskatchewan
- Insurance Corporation of British Columbia
- Manitoba Public Insurance
- Société de l'assurance automobile du Québec
