= Public auto insurance =

Government-run auto insurance system in Canada

Public auto insurance is a government-owned and -operated system of compulsory automobile insurance used in the Canadian provinces of British Columbia, Saskatchewan, Manitoba, and Quebec. It is based on the idea that if motorists are compelled to purchase auto insurance by the government, the government ought to ensure motorists pay fair premiums and receive high-quality coverage. Governments across the country have used various insurance schemes from full tort to full no-fault in pursuit of that goal.

Public auto insurers in Canada have historically operated on a not-for-profit basis. The exception is the Insurance Corporation of British Columbia (ICBC), which had its enabling legislation amended in 2010 to allow the provincial government to compel it to pay dividends into the provincial treasury.

== Versus private auto insurance ==
Arguments over public versus private provision of auto insurance often revolve around price and treatment of claimants. Ultimately, the question of which system is more efficient remains an open one.

The principled arguments for private insurance turn on the 'disciplining' effect of market competition. With regard to price, proponents of private insurance argue that an open and competitive market for auto insurance would force providers to be cost-efficient and to compete on price, therefore resulting in lower premiums. However, those in favour of public insurance provision argue that, since private companies would also have to make profits for their owners, a non-profit entity would be more likely to have low premiums.

With regard to claimants themselves, proponents of private insurance argue that competition will force private insurers to treat claimants as fairly as possible, since insureds will simply change providers if they feel mistreated. The counterargument to this is, given that all private insurers have similar profit pressures, they will all be similarly reluctant to pay benefits in order to increase their profit margins, thus resulting in insureds being poorly served no matter which insurer they choose – whereas a public insurer operating on a long-run break-even basis would have more flexibility to fully compensate claimants.

On an empirical level, cost comparisons across jurisdictions are difficult for several reasons. First, different jurisdictions use different insurance models. British Columbia, for example, uses a tort model with some no-fault accident benefits; Saskatchewan offers consumers a choice between no-fault and tort policies; Manitoba uses a no-fault model with the option to sue for economic damages in excess of no-fault benefits; and Québec uses a pure no-fault model with no option to sue. Second, mandated minimum levels of coverage and benefits can vary widely, even between provinces that use similar insurance models. Third, what is covered within a given category, such as medical benefits, may also differ between jurisdictions. Fourth, different parts of the country differ in areas such as demographics and weather, which may affect the costs of claims as well as accident frequency. Lastly, comparisons with other countries – and the United States in particular – are difficult since Canada's public healthcare system covers medical costs that would otherwise often be borne by auto insurers.

Because of this, it is difficult to conduct accurate comparisons of premiums across the country. An analysis that does not disclose its methodology, or that uses premium data drawn from multiple outside sources, is likely to be unreliable.

As would be expected, these complicating factors have resulted in various comparative studies of premiums across the country reaching different conclusions. For example, studies by the Consumers' Association of Canada found that rates in the four public-provision provinces are lower than in provinces that use a private auto insurance system. On the other hand, the Fraser Institute, a right-wing think-tank, released a survey in 2011 which concluded that the highest auto insurance rates in Canada were paid in Ontario, British Columbia, Saskatchewan, and Manitoba, of which the latter three operate public insurers. More recently, a 2015 Deloitte analysis conducted for Manitoba Public Insurance (MPI) found that the four provinces with public provision have the cheapest insurance rates.

== Canada ==
=== In British Columbia ===
The Insurance Corporation of British Columbia was created in 1973 by the NDP government of premier Dave Barrett. While it was initially opposed by the opposition Social Credit Party, ICBC became popular with the public and its continued existence has been supported by the government of the day ever since.

ICBC initially held a monopoly on all auto insurance, but in 1977, the provincial government opened up the optional insurance market. Despite the entrance of several firms in the 1980s, 87% of British Columbians who bought additional coverage did so from ICBC in 2003.

Since its inception, ICBC's mandate has changed several times. Initially, it was responsible for only insurance, but at various points since its creation it has also been responsible for social programs such as the CounterAttack anti-impaired driving initiative, traffic safety initiatives, vehicle and driver licensing, commercial transport and compliance, fine collection, and driver education.

In 2010, ICBC's enabling legislation, the Insurance Corporation Act, was amended by Christy Clark's British Columbia Liberal government to allow the Cabinet Committee to compel ICBC to pay specified dividends into the provincial treasury. Over the next several years, that has arguably had a large negative impact on ICBC's financial position and been pointed to as the underlying cause of ICBC's forecast for dramatic rate increases totalling over 40%.

In 2021, ICBC moved over from tort coverage to no-fault coverage.

=== In Manitoba ===
Manitoba Public Insurance (MPI) was created in 1971 by an NDP government under the leadership of Edward Schreyer. It had featured prominently in his campaign platform for the 1969 election. It is a non-profit Crown corporation that operates on a pure no-fault model.

=== In Quebec ===
In 1978, the Parti Québécois government of René Lévesque created the Régie de l'assurance automobile du Québec (RAAQ). In 1990, the RAAQ became the Société de l'assurance automobile du Québec (SAAQ). In Quebec, public auto insurance is limited to coverage of personal injuries while damage to property is covered by private insurers.

=== In Saskatchewan ===
Created in 1945 by Tommy Douglas's CCF government, Saskatchewan Government Insurance is the oldest public auto insurer in Canada. Saskatchewan is the only province in Canada that offers motorists a choice between no-fault and tort systems of insurance. Although a choice, majority of the people are unaware of it. By default, all Sask residents are enrolled into the no-fault systems, unless someone wishes to switch their coverage over to tort.

Out of province residents who are found partially or fully responsible for an accident in Saskatchewan can be pursued legally for non-economic damages by the Saskatchewan victim even if they have no-fault coverage.

There is no cap on minor injury benefits, and SGI does not mandate for their claimants to go for an eventual assessment to a doctor of their choice; which is a common practice in other provinces in an attempt to 86 the benefits being extended.

=== Elsewhere in Canada ===
Other provinces have considered introducing a public auto insurance system. The Ontario New Democratic Party won the 1990 provincial election on a platform that included public auto insurance. After assuming office, Premier Bob Rae appointed Peter Kormos, one of the most vocal proponents of public insurance, as the minister responsible for bringing forward the policy. With the onset of the early 1990s recession, however, both business and labour groups expressed concern about layoffs and lost revenues. The government dropped the policy in 1991, which was one reason for its loss of power in 1995.

Public auto insurance has also been considered in New Brunswick after private insurance rates nearly doubled from 2003 to 2005 but was ultimately rejected by the provincial government. It was also an issue in Nova Scotia during its 2003 provincial election and remained in the platform of the official opposition, the Nova Scotia New Democratic Party during the 2006 election campaign. However, it did not appear in the NDP platform in the 2009 campaign, and during the NDP's majority government, it failed to introduce a public insurance scheme. Public auto insurance was also under consideration by the Newfoundland and Labrador Progressive Conservative government of Danny Williams in 2004 as a "last resort" when private insurance firms threatened to pull out of the province in response to legislation rolling back premiums.

== Australia ==
Compulsory third-party insurance (CTP) exists in every state in Australia and is paid as part of vehicle registration. It covers the vehicle owner and any person who drives the vehicle against claims for liability for death or injury to people caused by the fault of the vehicle owner or driver. CTP may include any kind of physical harm, bodily injuries and may cover the cost of all reasonable medical treatment for injuries received in the crash, loss of wages, cost of care services and, in some cases, compensation for pain and suffering.

There are three states and one territory that do not have a private CTP scheme. In Victoria, the Transport Accident Commission provides CTP through a levy in the vehicle registration fee, known as the TAC charge. A similar scheme exists in Tasmania through the Motor Accidents Insurance Board. A similar scheme applies in Western Australia, through the Insurance Commission of Western Australia (ICWA). The Northern Territory scheme is managed through Territory Insurance Office (TIO). In South Australia prior to July 2016, Compulsory Third-Party Insurance was provided by the Motor Accident Commission, but is now provided by private companies.

== See also ==
- Saskatchewan Government Insurance
- Insurance Corporation of British Columbia
- Société de l'assurance automobile du Québec
- Manitoba Public Insurance
- Vehicle insurance
