= Coachman Insurance Company =

Canadian insurance company

- Type: Subsidiary
- Industry: Insurance
- Founded: 1979
- Headquarters: 10 Four Seasons Place, Suite 200; Toronto, Ontario, Canada
- Key people: Randy MacFarlane (COO)
- Owner: Saskatchewan Government Insurance
- Number of employees: 60
- Website: coachmaninsurance.ca

Coachman Insurance Company is a Canadian insurance company founded in 1979 and based in Ontario. Coachman was purchased in 2001 by SGI Canada Insurance Services, a subsidiary of Saskatchewan Government Insurance.

Coachman provides "non-standard" automobile insurance, such as for drivers with multiple accidents or traffic convictions. Standard automobile, personal property, and commercial property insurance in Ontario are offered under the SGI Canada brand.
