= Canadian veteran vehicle registration plates =

In Canada, motor vehicle licence plates are issued by the transportation department in each province and territory. Since 2002, most provinces and territories have introduced special licence plates for veterans of the Canadian Armed Forces or other allied militaries. The only territory that does not have a veteran licence plate is Nunavut. Common design features of these veteran licence plate include the image of a red poppy or the word "veteran". Only veteran licence plates issued by the Northwest Territories do not have any of the features mentioned above.

== Introduction dates ==
Province/Territory	Date of Introduction	Cost
Alberta	February 15, 2005	$5.00
British Columbia	June 4, 2004	$5.00
Manitoba	November 5, 2004	$5.00
Newfoundland and Labrador	September 2, 2003	$5.00
New Brunswick	November 1, 2003	$5.00
Northwest Territories	June 2004	$5.00
Nova Scotia	November 7, 2002	$5.00
Ontario	November 9, 2003	$5.00
Prince Edward Island	2003	$5.00
Quebec	January 1, 2006	$5.00
Saskatchewan	November 10, 2004	$5.00
Yukon	November 10, 2004	$5.00

=== Ontario ===
In Ontario, the Ministry of Transportation issued 27,000 veteran licence plates since 2003. Veterans can order a special licence plate with the format "000 VET" for display or gift purposes.

=== Québec ===
As of the 4th of May 2009, Québec now offers a veteran motorcycle plate.

=== Alberta ===
In Alberta, 15,750 veteran licence plates have been issued since 2005.

== Appearance ==
Province/Territory	Image	Serial format	First issued	Appearance
British Columbia		123VAB	2004	A red poppy superimposed onto a black and white photograph of a soldier on the left and the word "Veteran" on the top of the licence plate
Alberta		VAB 123	2005	A red poppy superimposed onto a red maple leaf on the left and the word "Veteran" at the bottom of the licence plate
Saskatchewan		V1234	2004	A red poppy superimposed onto a black and white photograph of a soldier's monument on the left and the word "Veteran" at the bottom of the licence plate
Manitoba		VAB 123	2004	A red poppy is in the middle of the gap between the alphanumeric and the word "Veteran" at the bottom of the licence plate
Ontario		1V2345	2003	A red poppy and the word "Veteran" are on the left hand side of the licence plate
Quebec		001 PAA through 999 PCZ (normal format)	2006	One version of the plate has a slight beige tint. A male and female soldier are looking to the left while the back of their heads fade into a poppy field. A red poppy is seen on the bottom left beside the standard "Je me souviens". To the left of the word "Québec" and the fleur-de-lys, the word "Vétérans" is written in red. Another version of the plate has a red poppy in the space between the numbers and letters.
Nova Scotia		ABC12	2002	A Canadian flag on the left and the word "Veteran" at the bottom of the licence plate
New Brunswick		WA123	2003	A red poppy on the left and the words "Veteran / Ancien combattant" at the bottom of the licence plate
New Brunswick		WAB01	2021	Embossed red serial on reflective white plate with curved gold and sky blue bands at the top; screened provincial wordmark (red galley graphic with small blue waves and "New" to the left, "Nouveau" to the right and "Brunswick" and "CANADA" below, all in green) on bands, centred above serial with red poppy to the left of serial
Prince Edward Island		VT1 234	2003	A red poppy superimposed onto the red maple leaf at the bottom left corner, a Canadian flag in the middle of the gap between the alphanumeric, and the word "Veteran" at the bottom of the licence plate
Newfoundland and Labrador		ABC 123	2003	A Canadian flag and the word "Veteran" at the bottom of the licence plate. The HHB, HJL, HJM, HJN and HJO letter series are set aside for veteran plates.
Yukon		1234	2004	A red poppy, the word "Veteran", and the phrase "Lest we forget" are on the right side of the licence plate
Northwest Territories		VET 123	2004	The border and the text of the licence plate is red (contrary to the normally blue licence plate)

== Eligibility ==
The licence plates are available to those who served as a member of Canadian Forces, the Commonwealth of Nations, or its wartime allies. People who served on North Atlantic Treaty Organization (NATO) missions, peacekeeping missions as members of the Canadian Forces or United Nations forces, or the Royal Canadian Mounted Police (RCMP) are also eligible. They need to provide a Canadian Forces Certificate of Service and a Canadian Forces Identification Card as proof of service. Those who have served three years (may still be serving) can also apply.

In British Columbia, veterans who operate trucks, vans, and motorcycle are also eligible to obtain a veteran licence plate in that province.

In New Brunswick, reservists who formerly served must provide acceptable documentation displaying at least 3 years of service for Canada to be eligible for Veteran status plates.
