= Manitoba Public Insurance =

Provincial crown corporation in Canada

- Company type: Crown corporation
- Industry: Public auto insurance
- Founded: November 1, 1971; 54 years ago
- Headquarters: Winnipeg, Manitoba, Canada
- Revenue: $1.6B
- Owner: Government of Manitoba
- Number of employees: 2,047
- Website: mpi.mb.ca

Manitoba Public Insurance Corporation (MPI) is the non-profit Crown corporation which administers public auto insurance, motor vehicle registration, and driver licensing in Manitoba. Established by the Government of Manitoba in 1971, it is headquartered in Winnipeg.

== History ==
MPl was created on November 1, 1971, as a result of the Manitoba Automobile Insurance Committee Report, which recommended a public auto insurance system to provide universally available, basic compulsory insurance.

MPI's mission to provide exceptional coverage and service, affordable rates, and safer roads through effective public auto insurance. The corporation aims to guarantee access to basic automobile insurance for all Manitobans, set fair rates and premiums, and promote road safety and prevent traffic collisions.

== Operations ==
MPI has claim and service centres in 12 communities across the province, and services are also available at approximately 300 independent insurance brokers across Manitoba.

The basic automobile insurance product offered by MPI is known more informally as Autopac. Basic automobile insurance is compulsory in Manitoba and is only available through MPI. Extension insurance products (lower deductibles, increased insurance coverage, etc.) are sold in competition with the private sector.

In fiscal year 2024/25, a typical workday saw 1,121 claims reported and approximately $4.8 million in paid claims.

== Vehicle registration plate lawsuits ==
In 2019, MPI was a defendant in two lawsuits financed by the Justice Centre for Constitutional Freedoms. The first challenged the revocation of an "ASIMIL8" license plate on the basis of a single complaint. Its owner, Nicholas Troller, testified that the plate was a reference to Star Trek. The second aimed to reinstate an "NDN CAR" license plate, previously issued to Bruce Spence to celebrate his "Indian" heritage.

== See also ==
- Insurance Corporation of British Columbia
- Saskatchewan Government Insurance
- State monopoly
