= Crown Investments Corporation =

Crown corporation in Saskatchewan

- Company type: Crown corporation
- Industry: Investment management
- Founded: 1947
- Headquarters: Regina, Saskatchewan, Canada
- Subsidiaries: Lotteries and Gaming Saskatchewan; Saskatchewan Government Insurance; SaskEnergy; SaskPower; SaskTel; SaskWater
- Website: cicorp.sk.ca

The Crown Investments Corporation (CIC) is a Crown corporation owned by the Government of Saskatchewan. It functions as a holding company to manage the province's commercial Crown corporations, as well as the provincial government's minority holdings in private sector ventures.

== History ==
CIC started out as the Government Finance Office (GFO) in 1947. Its job was to manage, direct investment, and return dividends of various commercial Crown corporations to the Government. The profits from the Crown corporations were reinvested or given back to the government. The GFO was also used to invest government money in various Crowns.

In 1978, the name was changed to Crown Investment Corporation.
