= Dunlop Island =

Island of Antarctica

Coordinates: 77°14′S 163°30′E

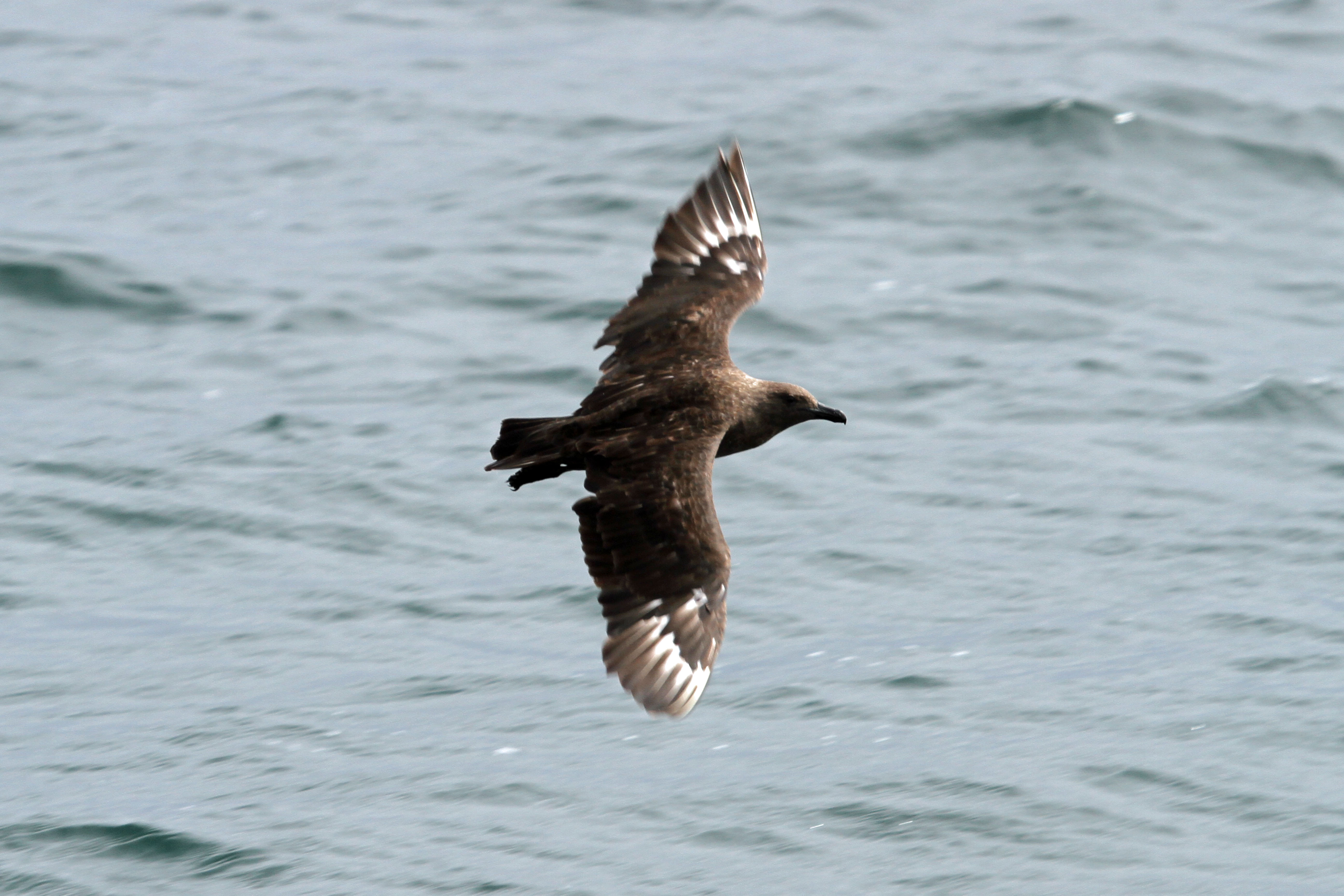
South polar skuas breed in the IBA

Dunlop Island is a rocky island, one nautical mile (2 km) long, lying just off the Wilson Piedmont Glacier and the coast of Victoria Land, close northeast of Cape Dunlop. It was first mapped by the British Antarctic Expedition, 1907–09, under Ernest Shackleton, who named it for H.J.L. Dunlop, chief engineer of the ship Nimrod.

== Important Bird Area ==
A 168 ha site comprising the whole island has been designated an Important Bird Area (IBA) by BirdLife International because it supports a breeding colony of south polar skuas, with some 88 breeding pairs reported in 1982.

== See also ==
- List of antarctic and sub-antarctic islands
