= Insurance Corporation of British Columbia =

Provincial crown corporation in Canada

- Type: Crown corporation
- Industry: Insurance
- Founded: 1973; 53 years ago
- Headquarters: 151 Esplanade West, North Vancouver, British Columbia, Canada
- Products: Vehicle insurance
- Revenue: 5.52 Billion CAD (2021)
- Net income: 1.538 Billion CAD (2021)
- Owner: Government of British Columbia
- Number of employees: 5,200
- Website: icbc.com

The Insurance Corporation of British Columbia (ICBC) is a provincial Crown corporation in British Columbia providing vehicle insurance and driver's licences. ICBC was created in 1973 by the NDP government of Premier Dave Barrett.

By law, any vehicle registered and driven or parked on public streets in British Columbia must be covered by ICBC's basic insurance package, which can be purchased from independent brokers across the province. This basic coverage, called "Autoplan", includes protection from third party legal liability, under-insured motorist protection, accident benefits, and inverse liability (which provides compensation if a driver is involved in an accident in jurisdictions that forbid drivers from recovering losses incurred from a driver who is at fault in the accident).

== History ==
The original purpose of ICBC was to provide universal and affordable compulsory public auto insurance in British Columbia by operating on a non-profit basis. However, in March 2010, Christy Clark's BC Liberal government announced that they would require ICBC to pay the province dividends totalling some $778 million over three years, thus signalling the end of ICBC's operation as a non-profit Crown corporation, and also making it the only for-profit public auto insurance provider in Canada. These dividends eventually totaled $1.2 billion. This was undone by the NDP government after their victory in the 2017 BC provincial election, who subsequently passed legislation ensuring ICBC's profits remain with the company and cannot be transferred to the provincial government. Since ICBC's creation, its responsibilities have expanded to include driver licensing, vehicle registration, and various road safety initiatives.

When ICBC was established, it initially held a monopoly on all automobile insurance in the province, but in 1977 its enabling legislation was amended to allow private insurers to compete with it in the market for optional (supplemental) insurance (including coverage such as extended liability, collision, and comprehensive plans). ICBC continues to both hold a monopoly on basic insurance and offer optional additional coverage.

=== Recent history ===
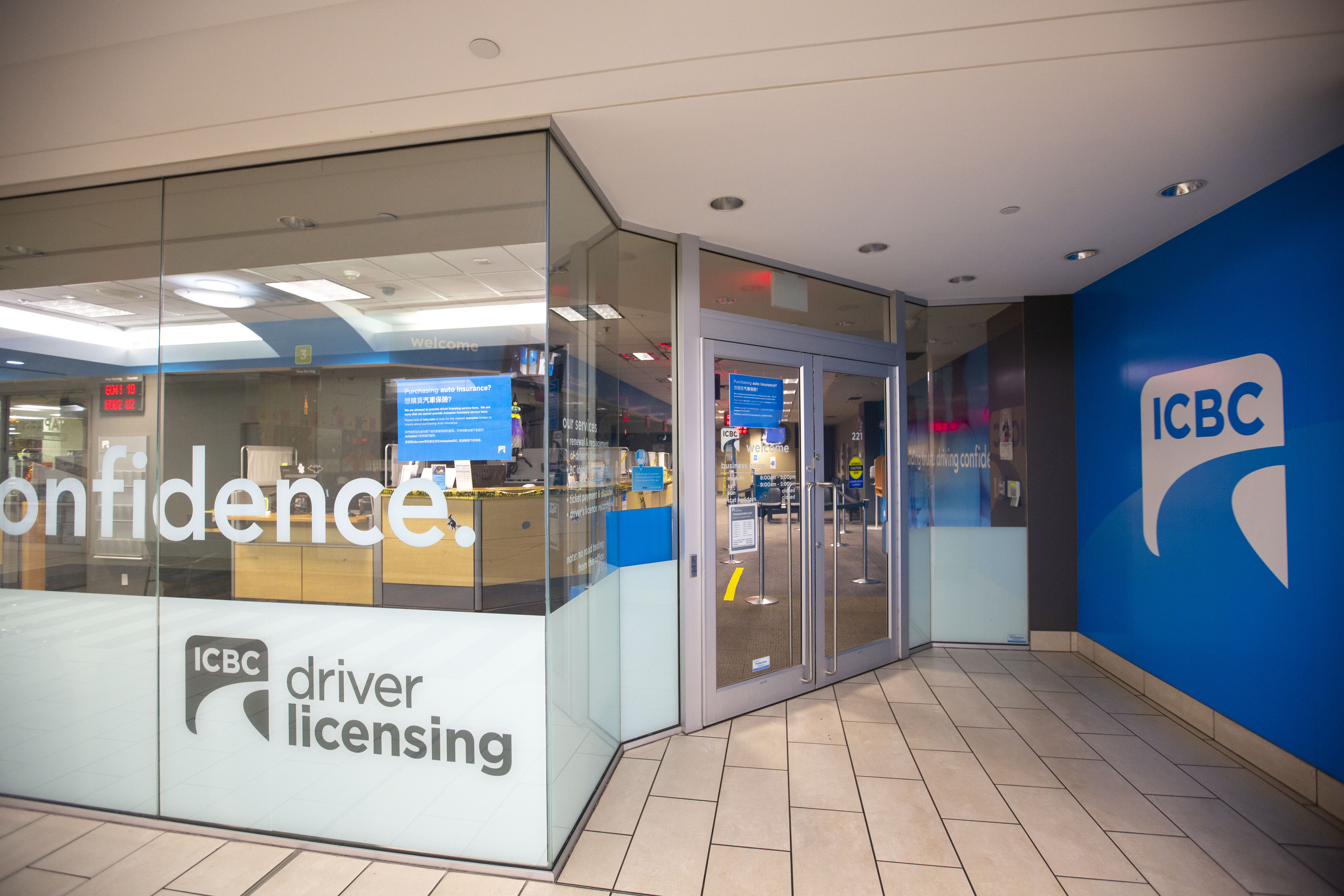
An ICBC Driver Licensing Centre in Royal Centre, Vancouver

On November 23, 2016, the provincial government announced that 'luxury' cars (those worth over $150,000) will no longer be insured by ICBC. In 2016, there were approximately 3000 cars in this class insured by ICBC; the government claimed that this change would save approximately $2.3 million per year. High-end car dealers have criticized this change, arguing that it would be better to adjust the rates that these car owners pay rather than ignore an entire segment of vehicles on the road. In 2017, ICBC introduced a modified version of this new system, whereby 'luxury' vehicles could still be insured but would face having to pay higher premiums starting on January 8, 2017. Vehicles in this class may also require an application to "obtain own damage coverage, which includes Collision, Comprehensive, and Specified Perils coverage".

In 2019, ICBC overhauled its rate structure for liability insurance by shifting to a private-sector model where drivers in higher risk categories will pay higher premiums. Then-BC Attorney General David Eby condemned the high rates, stressing the need for price reductions for young drivers, while acknowledging that rates are still subsidized.

In February 2020, the BC provincial government announced that they were switching ICBC from a "litigation based model" to a "no-fault" model. Under this new model "people involved in vehicle crashes can no longer sue for damages except in cases involving court convictions for offences like negligence, street racing, impaired driving, or in cases of faulty manufacturing, botched repairs and the over-service of alcohol by a business". Instead of suing, people "will receive benefits, payments for medical treatment and compensation directly from ICBC, using amounts set by the province depending on the type of injury". This change is estimated to save ICBC "$2.9 billion in legal fees, pain and suffering and injury claims in 2022". Of the $2.9 billion, $1.2 billion will be "redirected into boosting treatment benefits and quickening response times for claims", and 1.7 billion were to be used to implement the 20% rate cut. In January 2021 the British Columbia Utilities Commission (BCUC), which regulates ICBC, approved a "a 15 per cent decrease to basic insurance rates", with ICBC stating that "With the introduction of ICBC's new Enhanced Care coverage in May 2021, drivers will save on average 20 per cent on their combined basic and optional vehicle insurance".

In February 2021, the BC government announced that BC drivers "will get a one-time cheque averaging $190" due to "An improved financial outlook at ICBC, partially the result of fewer crashes and accident claims during the [COVID-19] pandemic". A second rebate was announced in July 2021, averaging $120 per policy holder.

In March 2022, the BC government announced that ICBC "will provide a one-time relief rebate of $110 to customers to ease the financial burden of increased gas prices caused by the 2022 Russian invasion of Ukraine." The government stated that the funds for the rebates would come from the "net income of $1.9 billion for the fiscal year ending March 31, 2022", with the remainder being "reinvested into ICBC’s capital reserves to ensure rates remain affordable for the long term."

In December 2022, the NDP provincial government announced it had filed an application for there to be no basic insurance rate increases for two years with the BC Utilities Commission, marking 5 years of no basic insurance rate increases.

== Operations ==
ICBC also funds physical rehabilitation services like physiotherapy for individuals injured in motor vehicle accidents. These treatments are typically covered under the Enhanced Care model and delivered through approved clinics across British Columbia.

=== Governance ===
ICBC is governed by a board of directors appointed according to the provisions of the Insurance Corporation Act, ICBC's enabling statute. The board of directors, the CEO, and ICBC management govern ICBC in accordance with corporate governance best practices, and in accordance with the provisions of the enabling legislation, the Motor Vehicle Act, other legislation applicable to ICBC, and directives from the provincial Cabinet Committee. Proof of insurance is demonstrated, in part, by the application of a decal to the licence plate. As of May 1, 2022 decals are discontinued and will no longer be issued. This was done as part of the transition to online renewals.

=== Rates and finances ===
Like other insurance companies, ICBC bases its premiums on a client's claims history, type of automobile, geographic location, and years of driving experience. The Corporation assigns each driver a "driver factor" number for each type of insurance offered. This driver factor determines the discount/surcharge the customer pays for each type of insurance, with lower driver factors meaning lower premiums and lower risk.

Rates applicable to ICBC's basic automobile insurance coverage are subject to the review of, and are set by, the BCUC. In practice, however, the Cabinet of the provincial government controls ICBC's rate setting through its power to set target financial outcomes (such as capital reserve ratios and profits), and through its ability to issue Special Directives to the BCUC.

Revenue collected by the Corporation goes mostly towards paying insurance benefits and operational costs. The remainder is devoted to fulfilling ICBC's mandate to promote safe driving (the "RoadSense" campaign), as well as various other loss prevention strategies.

ICBC funds services, such as counselling for clients who have been in a car accident or who have had a family member pass due to a car accident.

== See also ==
- Manitoba Public Insurance
- Saskatchewan Government Insurance
- Société de l'assurance automobile du Québec
- AirCare (emissions program)
