= Vehicle registration plates of the United Kingdom =

United Kingdom of Great Britain and Northern Ireland
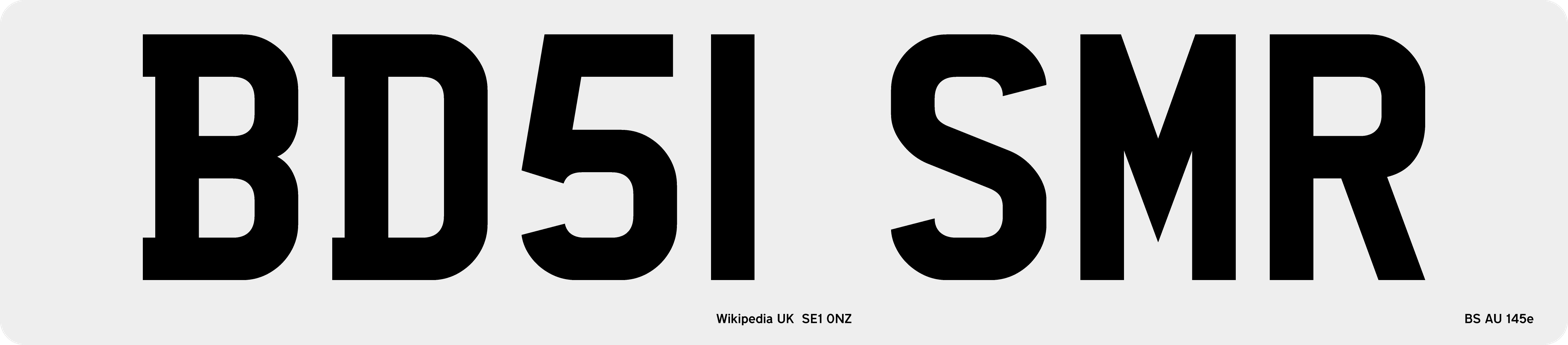

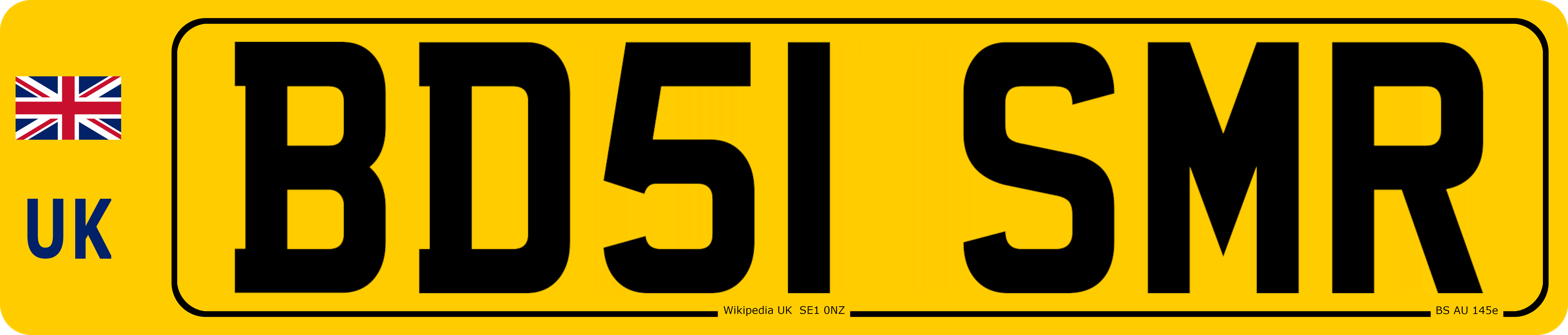
- UK regular legal standard front (top) and rear (bottom) number plates. The national identifier on the UK's number plates is optional. Number plates including the "UK" code are valid in countries party to the Vienna Convention on Road Traffic if displayed on its own or together with the Union Jack. (Note: The Europlates & plain plates are allowed post-Brexit after 2022. See Standard Requirements.)
- Country: United Kingdom
- Country code: UK (previously GB)

Current series
- Size: 520 mm × 111 mm 20.5 in × 4.4 in
- Serial format: AA11 AAA
- Colour (front): Black on white
- Colour (rear): Black on yellow
- Introduced: 1 September 2001

Availability
- Issued by: Driver and Vehicle Licensing Agency

History
- First issued: 1 January 1904

Vehicle registration plates (commonly referred to as "number plates" in British English) are the alphanumeric plates used to display the registration mark of a vehicle, and have existed in the United Kingdom since 1904. It is compulsory for motor vehicles used on public roads to display vehicle registration plates, with the exception of vehicles of the reigning monarch used on official business.

The Motor Car Act 1903, which came into force on 1 January 1904, required all motor vehicles to be entered on an official vehicle register, and to carry alphanumeric plates. The Act was passed in order that vehicles could be easily traced in the event of an accident, contravention of the law or any other incident. Vehicle registration alphanumeric plates in the UK are rectangular or square in shape, with the exact permitted dimensions of the plate and its lettering set down in law. Front plates are white, rear plates are yellow.

Within the UK itself, there are two systems: one for Great Britain, whose current format dates from 2001, and another for Northern Ireland, which is similar to the original 1904 system. Both systems are administered by the Driver and Vehicle Licensing Agency (DVLA) in Swansea. Until July 2014, Northern Ireland's system was administered by the Driver and Vehicle Agency (DVA) in Coleraine, which had the same status as the DVLA. Other schemes relating to the UK are also listed below. The international vehicle registration code for the United Kingdom is UK. Prior to 28 September 2021, it was GB. The specification of plates incorporating the UK code was created by the British Number Plate Manufacturers Association, and is seen as the default design by the Department for Transport.

== Standard requirements ==
Black number plates with white or silver characters are permitted on older vehicles, if registered under the Historic Vehicle taxation class and constructed prior to 1973 (subsequently amended to those constructed prior to 1980). This vehicle was registered in Truro (AF) between 1972 and 1973 (L), an example of the 1963–1983 suffix system.

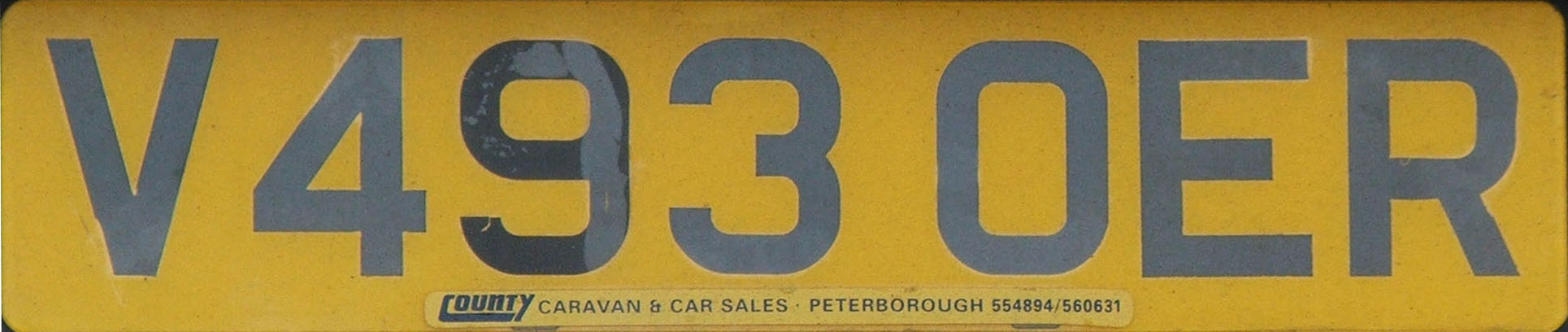
The post-1973 yellow rear number plate of a vehicle registered in Peterborough (ER) between 1999 and 2000 (V), an example of the 1983–2001 prefix system. This Charles Wright typeface was the most common in the UK prior to the "prescribed font" for number plates purchased from September 2001 onward.

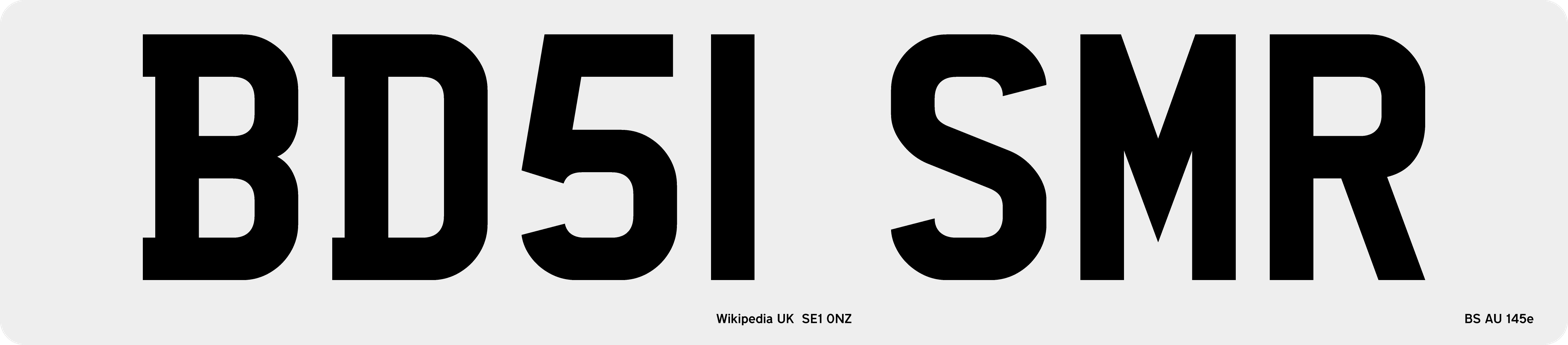
The "prescribed font" must be used for plates purchased from September 2001. This vehicle was registered in Birmingham (BD) between 2001 and 2002 (51), an example of the 2001–present system. This is an example of a post-1973 white front number plate.

The optional EU band was introduced in 1998, and is now prohibited on plates fitted after January 2021 following Brexit. This is the front plate of a vehicle registered in County Down, Northern Ireland, issued prior to 2021. Northern Ireland uses a modified version of the system. The optional EU band on this plate says GB (Great Britain), the official code for all of the UK (Great Britain and Northern Ireland) prior to October 2021.

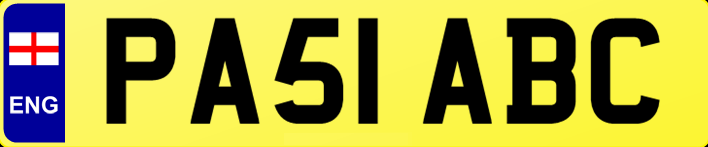
National emblems and identifiers, such as the St. George's Cross and "ENG" for England are permitted on the optional left band. From 2021, this should be transparent rather than with a blue background.

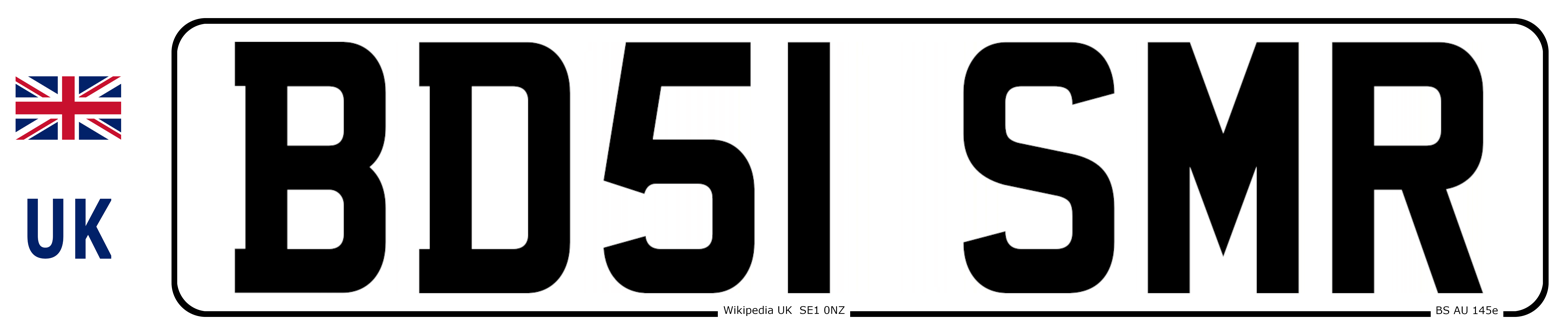
The optional standard national identifier has been 'UK' instead of 'GB' from 2021, with a transparent background. This can be blank or contain the Union Jack.

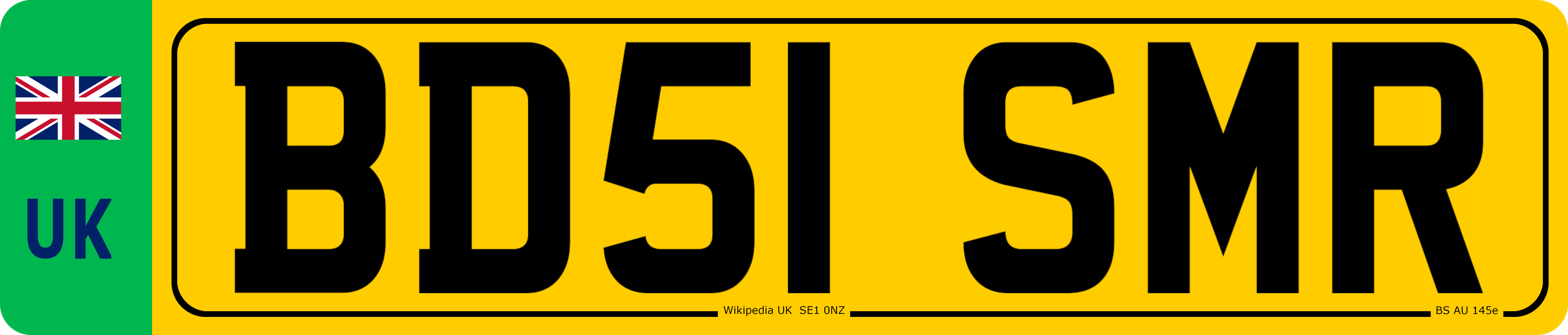
The optional left band can be green on zero-emissions vehicles.

Number plates must be displayed in accordance with the Road Vehicles (Display of Registration Marks) Regulations 2001.

Number plates must be made of reflex-reflecting material, white at the front and yellow at the rear, with black characters. This was first required on all vehicles manufactured after 1 January 1973, having been optional before then. Subsequently, the requirement was modified by the Finance Act 2014, to allow any vehicles registered within the "historic vehicles" tax class to use the older style pre-1973 black number plates. This rule applied on a 40-year exemption basis, and until 2021 rolled forward automatically each year on 1 April to include vehicles manufactured before the first of January forty years prior. A change was introduced on 1 January 2021 that will permit only vehicles dating prior to 1 January 1980 to use the old style pre-1973 black and silver number plates.

The post-1973 type of reflecting plate were permitted as an option from 1968: many older vehicles may therefore carry the white/yellow reflective plates and, where they were first registered during or after 1968, they may have carried such plates since new. Many buses delivered to London Transport between 1973 and the mid-1980s continued to bear white-on-black plates. This was also true of some other bus operators, though only on the rear end in most instances; Reading Transport was one other operator which persisted with black front plates into the 1980s.

Characters on number plates purchased from 1 September 2001 do not use a specific named typeface, but must use what is known as the "prescribed font" within legislation set out in The Road Vehicles (Display of Registration Marks) Regulations 2001. One such example of a typeface adhering to this prescribed font is Mandatory, a variation of the frequently used Charles Wright typeface. However, the wording in the legislation designates that slight variations in typeface are legal providing they are "substantially similar" to the prescribed font.

Characters must also conform to set specifications as to width, height, stroke, spacing and margins. The physical characteristics of the number plates are set out in British Standard BS AU 145e (formerly BS AU 145d until 31 August 2021), which specifies visibility, strength, and reflectivity.

Number plates with smaller characters meeting standards for motorcycles are only permitted on imported vehicles, and then only if they do not have European Community Whole Vehicle Type Approval and their construction/design cannot accommodate standard-size number plates; for example, vehicles made for the US or Japanese market may only have a 305 mm × 152 mm (12.0 in × 6.0 in) area to affix a number plate, in which a standard one-line plate is too long (460 mm) to fit, while a two-line plate is too tall (199 mm).

The industry-standard-size front number plate is 520 mm × 111 mm (20 1/2 in × 4 3/8 in). Rear plates are either the same size, or 285 mm × 203 mm (11 1/4 in × 8 in) or 533 mm × 152 mm (21 in × 6 in). There is no specified legal size other than an absolute minimum margin of 11 mm producing a minimum height of 101 mm (one-line) and 199 mm (two-line) on cars, and 86 mm for one-line import vehicles and 164 mm for a two-line motorcycle or import vehicles, with the overall length being based on the registration number itself. The material of UK number plates must either comply with British Standard BS AU 145e, which states that BSI number plates must be marked on the plate with the BSI logo and the name and postcode of the manufacturer and the supplier of the plates; or with

(b) any other relevant standard or specification recognised for use in an EEA State and which, when in use, offers a performance equivalent to that offered by a plate complying with the British Standard specification, and which, in either case, is marked with the number (or such other information as is necessary to permit identification) of that standard or specification.

Older British plates had white, grey or silver characters on a black background. This style of plate was phased out in 1972 and, until 2012, legal to be carried only on vehicles first registered before 1 January 1973. A vehicle which was first registered on or after 1 January 1973 shall be treated as if it was first registered before that date if it was constructed before 1 January 1973. However, the Finance Bill 2014 and subsequent Finance Acts extended the Historic Vehicle class cut-off year from 1973 to 1974 and subsequently, a rolling forty years. This had the effect of linking eligibility to display old-style plates with "Tax Exempt" vehicle status, provided that an application had been made to the DVLA to have the vehicle included in the historic vehicle class. However, this exemption was rescinded in 2021, with a new qualifying date for vehicles constructed before 1 January 1980 registered in the historic vehicle class.

=== Motorcycles ===
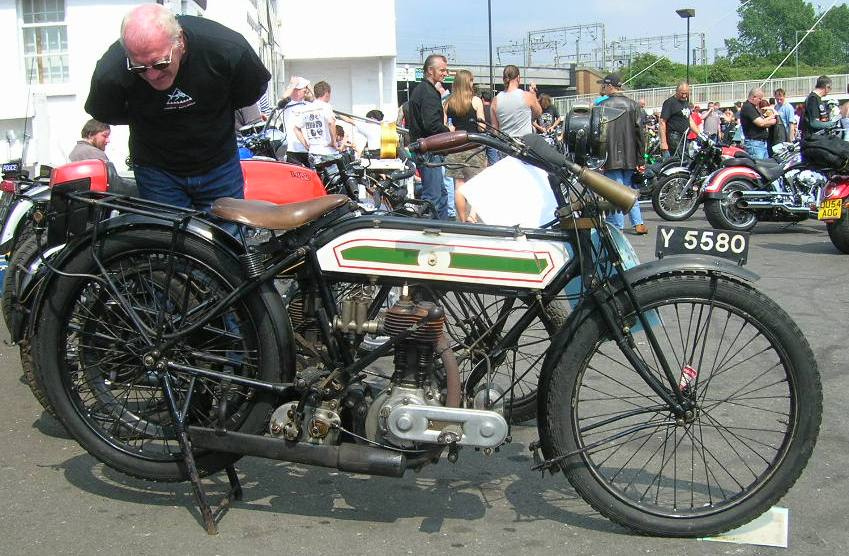
Vintage Triumph motorcycle with front plate

Before August 1975, motorcycles had to display a front plate, colloquially known as the "pedestrian slicer", which was usually, but not always, a double-sided plate on top of the front mudguard, curved to follow the contour of the wheel and visible from the sides. Motorcycles registered after 1 September 2001 may only display a rear number plate, while motorcycles registered before that date can display a number plate at the front if desired.

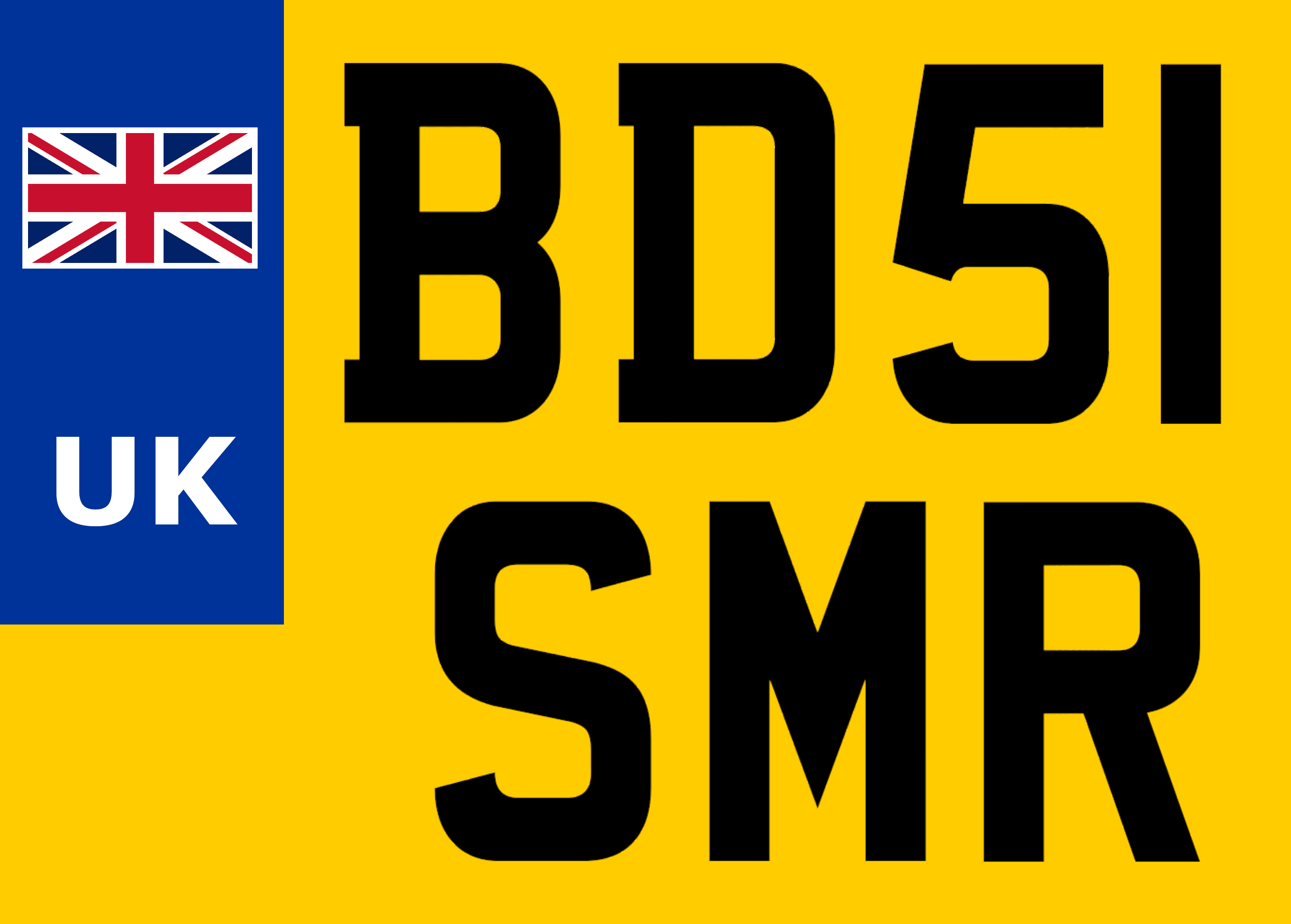
Standard motorcycle plate displaying the optional national identifier

== Great Britain ==

=== Current system ===
==== Characters ====
The current system for Great Britain was introduced on 1 September 2001. Each registration index consists of seven characters with a defined format.

From left to right, the characters consist of:

- A local memory tag, or area code, consisting of two letters which together indicate the local registration office. By December 2013, all local offices had been closed, but the letters still represent a region. The letters I, Q and Z are not used as local office identifiers, though O is used for Oxford; Z can be used only as a random letter.
  - The first of these two letters is a mnemonic, standing for the name of the broad area where the registration office was located. This is intended to make the registration more memorable than an arbitrary code. For example, A is used as the first character in all registrations issued by the three offices located in the vicinity of East Anglia;
- A two-digit age identifier, which changes twice a year, on 1 March and 1 September. The code is either the last two digits of the year itself, if issued between March and August (e.g. "18" for registrations issued between 1 March and 31 August 2018), or else has fifty added to that value if issued between September and February the following year, (e.g. "68" for registrations issued between 1 September 2018 and 28 February 2019);
- A three-letter sequence which uniquely distinguishes each of the vehicles displaying the same initial four-character area and age sequence. The letters I and Q are excluded from the three-letter sequence, as are combinations that may appear offensive (including those in foreign languages). Due to batch allocation of new registration marks to dealers, it is common for cars with "neighbouring" letter sequences to be of the same manufacturer.

This scheme has three particular advantages:-

- A buyer of a second-hand vehicle can in theory determine the year of first registration of the vehicle without having to look it up. However, a vehicle is permitted to display a number plate where the age identifier is older (but not newer) than the vehicle. The wide awareness of how the "age identifier" works has led to it being used in advertising by used car showrooms instead of simply stating a year.
- In the case of a police investigation of an accident or vehicle-related crime, witnesses usually remember the initial area code letters – it is then quite simple to narrow down suspect vehicles to a much smaller number by checking the authority's database without having to know the full number.
- The scheme should have sufficient numbers to run until 28 February 2051, assuming there are enough three-letter random sequences for every combination of area code and age identifier.

==== Local memory tags ====
First letter	Official local mnemonic	DVLA Office	Second letter (DVLA Office identifier)
A	Anglia	Peterborough	A B C D E F G J K M N
A	Anglia	Reserved for select issue	H L
A	Anglia	Norwich	O P R S T U
A	Anglia	Ipswich	V W X Y
B	Birmingham	Birmingham	A B C D E F G H J K L M N O P R S T U V W X
B	Birmingham	Reserved for select issue	Y
C	Cymru (Wales)	Cardiff	A B C D E F G H J K L M N O
C	Cymru (Wales)	Swansea	P R S T U V
C	Cymru (Wales)	Bangor	W X Y
D	Deeside to Shrewsbury	Chester	A B C D E F G H J K
D	Deeside to Shrewsbury	Shrewsbury	L M N O P S T U V W X Y
D	Deeside to Shrewsbury	Reserved for select issue	R
E	Essex	Chelmsford	A B C E F G J K L M N O P R S T U V W X Y
E	Essex	Reserved for select issue	D H
F	Forest and Fens	Nottingham	A B C D E F G H J K L M N P
F	Forest and Fens	Only issued with approval	O U
F	Forest and Fens	Lincoln	R S T V W X Y
G	Garden of England	Maidstone	A B C D E F G H J K L M N
G	Garden of England	Reserved for select issue	O
G	Garden of England	Brighton	P R S T U V W X Y
H	Hampshire and Dorset	Bournemouth	A B C D E F G H J
H	Hampshire and Dorset	Portsmouth	K L M N P R S T U V X Y
H	Hampshire and Dorset	Reserved for select issue	O
H	Hampshire and Dorset	Reserved for the Isle of Wight (issued in Portsmouth)	W
K	– (Note: There is no official name ascribed to the letter K by the DVLA.)	Borehamwood (formerly Luton) (Note: Luton DVLA office, until 8 February 2010 when it closed and had all operations moved to Borehamwood)	A B C D E F G H J K L
K	–	Northampton	M N O P R S T U V W X Y
L	London	Wimbledon	A B C D E F G H J
L	London	Borehamwood (formerly Stanmore)	K L M N O P R S T
L	London	Sidcup	U V W X Y
M	Manchester and Merseyside	Manchester	A B C D E F G H J K L M P T U V W X
M	Manchester and Merseyside	Reserved for the Isle of Man (not issued)	N
M	Manchester and Merseyside	Reserved for select issue	O R S Y
N	North	Newcastle	A B C D E G H J K L M N O
N	North	Stockton	P R S T U V W X Y
N	North	Issued with approval	F
O	Oxford	Oxford	A B C D E F G H J L M O P T U V W X Y
O	Oxford	Reserved for select issue	K N R S
P	Preston	Preston	A B C D E F G H J K L M N O P R S T
P	Preston	Carlisle	U V W X Y
R	Reading	Reading	A B C D E F G H J K L M N O P R S T V W X Y
R	Reading	Reserved for select issue	U
S	Scotland (Note: The first letter T was additionally used for some registrations in Scotland in 2007. TN07 was used instead of SN07 as the latter too closely resembled the word SNOT. Also in circulation during the 07 period were TF, TJ, and TK, but unlike TN they did not replace the original counterparts. All combinations employing T as a first letter would cease circulation from 57 reg.)	Glasgow	A B C D E F G H J
S	Scotland	Edinburgh	K L M N O
S	Scotland	Dundee	P R S T
S	Scotland	Reserved for select issue	U
S	Scotland	Aberdeen	V W
S	Scotland	Inverness	X Y
V	Severn Valley	Worcester	A B C E F G H J K L M N O P R S T U V X Y
V	Severn Valley	Reserved for select issue	D W
W	West of England	Exeter	A B D E F G H J
W	West of England	Reserved for select issue	C
W	West of England	Truro	K L
W	West of England	Bristol	M N O P R S T U V W X Y
X	Personal export	Beverley; Birmingham; Bristol; Chelmsford; Glasgow; Leeds; Lincoln; Maidstone; Manchester; Northampton; Norwich; Oxford; Stockton; Wimbledon	A (March/September issue); B (April/October issue); C (May/November issue); D (June/December issue); E (July/January issue); F (August/February issue)
X	Personal export	Reserved for select issue	G H J K L M N O P R S T U V W X Y
Y	Yorkshire	Leeds (Note: YA and YO were originally reserved for select issue; however, they are now issued as standard due to increasing demand.) (Note: YL was allocated to Sheffield for the 51 registration period, but now appears to be allocated to Leeds; may vary depending on demand.)	A B C D E F G H J K L
Y	Yorkshire	Sheffield (Note: YV was allocated to Beverley for the 51 registration period, but now appears to be allocated to Sheffield; may vary depending on demand.)	M N O P R S T U V
Y	Yorkshire	Beverley	W X Y

In addition to the above local memory tags, personalised registrations are also offered with arbitrary "local memory tags" prefixes, except for the letters I, Q and Z but including the letters J, T and U, which are unused as area codes.

==== Age identifiers ====
Year	1 March – 31 August	1 September – 28/29 February
2001/02	Y (Note: Last year identifier from previous system)	51
2002/03	02	52
2003/04	03	53
2004/05	04	54
2005/06	05	55
2006/07	06	56
2007/08	07	57
2008/09	08	58
2009/10	09	59
2010/11	10	60
2011/12	11	61
2012/13	12	62
2013/14	13	63
2014/15	14	64
2015/16	15	65
2016/17	16	66
2017/18	17	67
2018/19	18	68
2019/20	19	69
2020/21	20	70
2021/22	21	71
2022/23	22	72
2023/24	23	73
2024/25	24	74
2025/26	25	75

Year	1 March – 31 August	1 September – 28/29 February
2026/27	26	76
2027/28	27	77
2028/29	28	78
2029/30	29	79
2030/31	30	80
2031/32	31	81
2032/33	32	82
2033/34	33	83
2034/35	34	84
2035/36	35	85
2036/37	36	86
2037/38	37	87
2038/39	38	88
2039/40	39	89
2040/41	40	90
2041/42	41	91
2042/43	42	92
2043/44	43	93
2044/45	44	94
2045/46	45	95
2046/47	46	96
2047/48	47	97
2048/49	48	98
2049/50	49	99
2050/51	50	00

==== National identifier and emblems ====
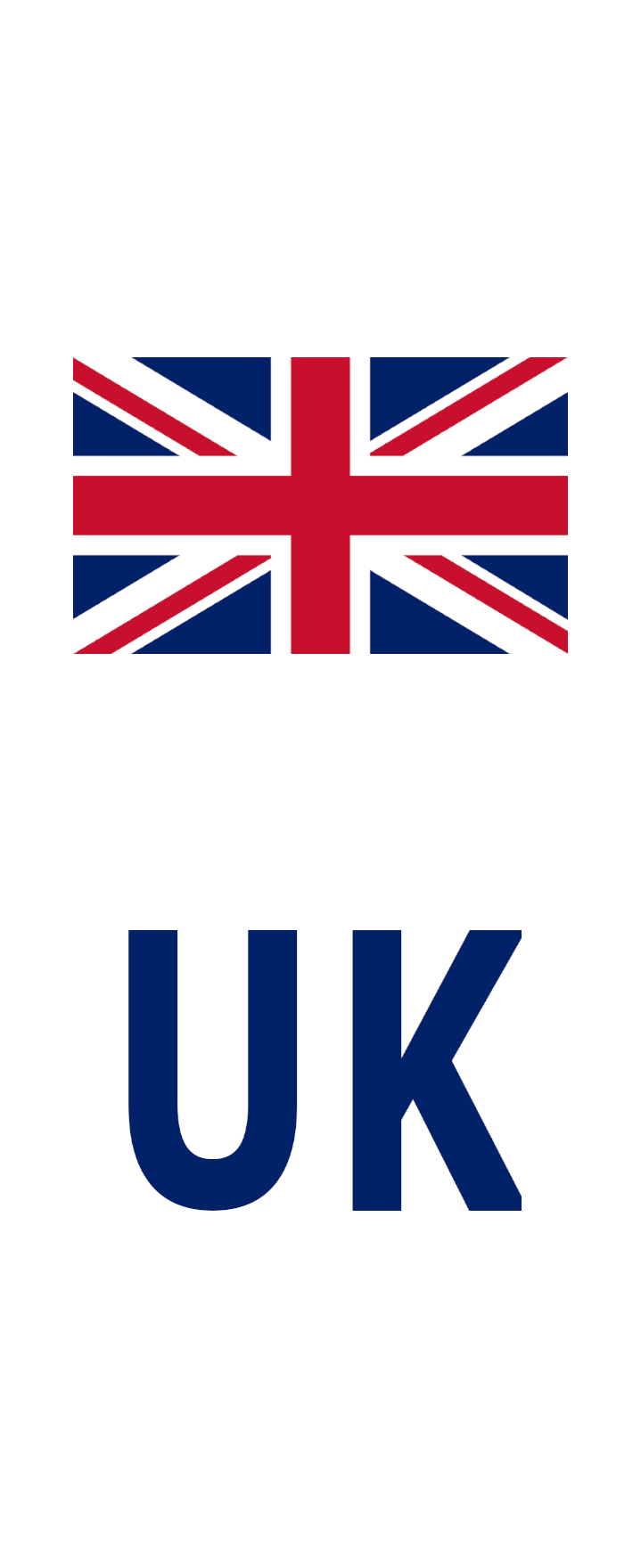
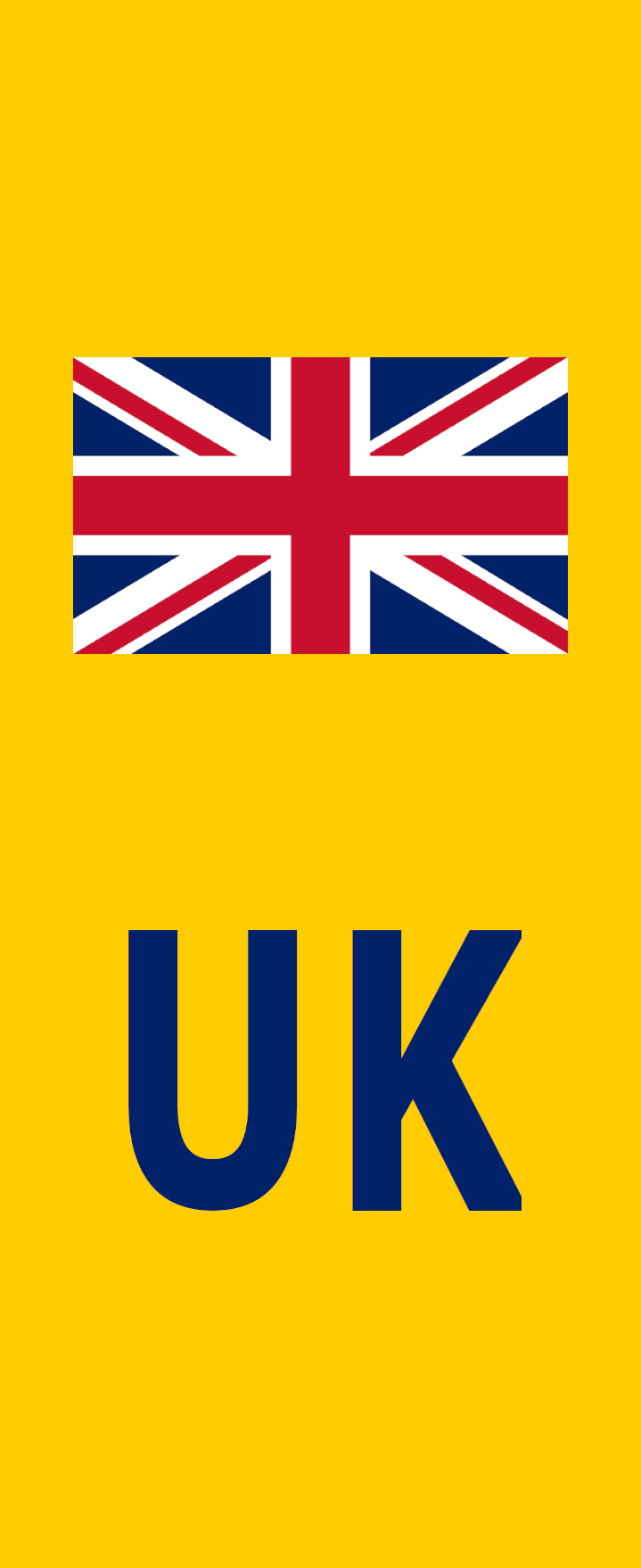
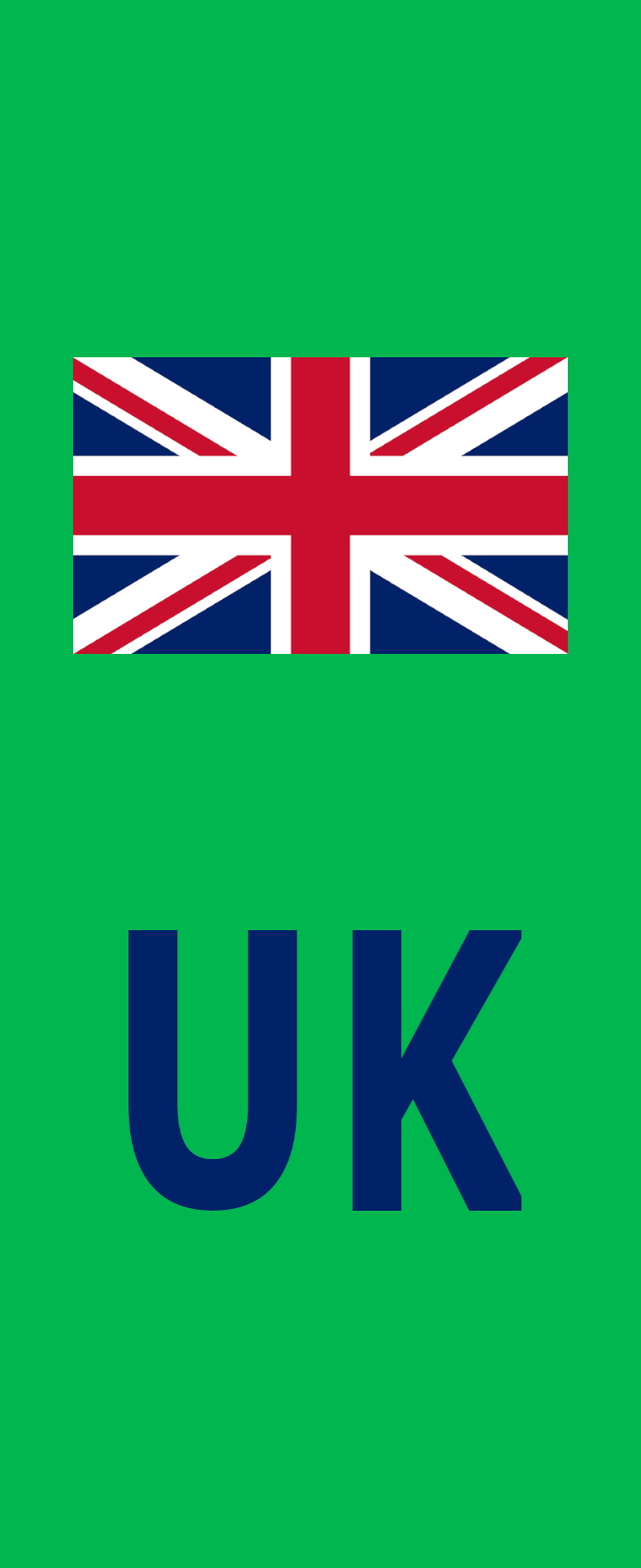
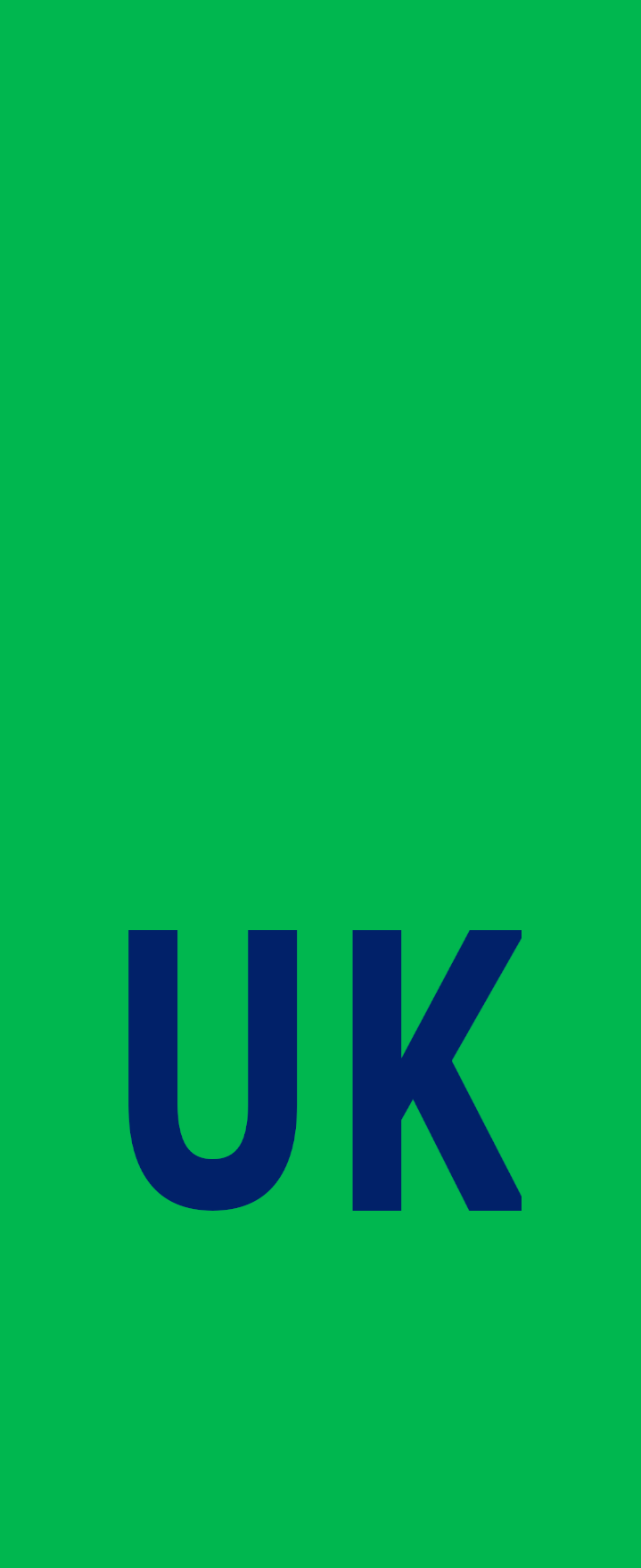
Number plates with a "UK" identifier displayed on its own or with a Union Flag satisfy Vienna Convention on Road Traffic and are valid in countries party to the Convention. Before 28 September 2021 the UK's identifier was "GB". Since then, according to the default design, the left-side colour band should be omitted (blue was previously used to construct the colours of the EU flag), with a green band reserved for zero-emissions vehicles. The "UK" text can be black (matching the main text on the plate) or blue (matching the blue in the Union Flag).

Vehicles registered in Great Britain are authorised by the Driver and Vehicle Licensing Agency to use number plates featuring the national flag of England, Wales, Scotland, or the Union Flag, plus lettering. Either the full wording or the abbreviation is used ("ENG" or "ENGLAND" for the English flag, "CYM", "CYMRU", or "WALES" for the Welsh flag, "SCO" or "SCOTLAND" for the Scottish flag, and "GB", "GREAT BRITAIN", "UK" or "UNITED KINGDOM" for the Union flag respectively).

Only number plates with the distinguishing code "UK" on its own, or together with the Union flag are valid as a distinguishing sign when driving in countries party to the Vienna Convention on Road Traffic, as such number plate displays a distinguishing code for the country of registration incorporated into the vehicle registration plate, and is supplemented with a flag or emblem of the national state, and hence satisfies the requirements set out in the convention. A "UK" black on white sticker must be affixed at the rear of the vehicle when driving abroad if said vehicle has number plates with the national flag of England, Wales, or Scotland.

From October 2021 if an owner of a vehicle wishes to avoid attaching a separate black on white "UK" sticker, it is necessary for the number plates to display "UK" on the left side together with, optionally, a Union flag (but not a national flag of England, Wales or Scotland). If the vehicle is driven in a country not a party to the Vienna Convention, a separate sign (black on white "UK" sticker) also has to be displayed at the rear of the vehicle. Of the EU countries, a separate identifier is needed only when travelling in Cyprus, Malta and Spain, as they are not party to the convention. (Note: "Ireland is not a party of the Vienna Convention but no separate "GB" sticker is required." Accessed in June 2021)

The specification of plates incorporating the UK code was created by the British Number Plate Manufacturers Association, and is seen as the default design by the Department for Transport:

- "UK" in black (matching the main text on the plate) or blue (matching the blue in the Union flag).
- The Union flag in landscape in specific colours (the flag must be positioned to the far-left side of the number plate)
- A background that is the same colour as the number plate (white for front, yellow for rear) except for green flash plates, where the background area behind the flag can be the same as set out on green number plates.

Up until 28 September 2021 the distinguishing sign was GB. On 30 June 2021, the United Nations published a notification stating that the United Kingdom has given three months' notification that it intended to change its distinguishing sign from GB to UK.

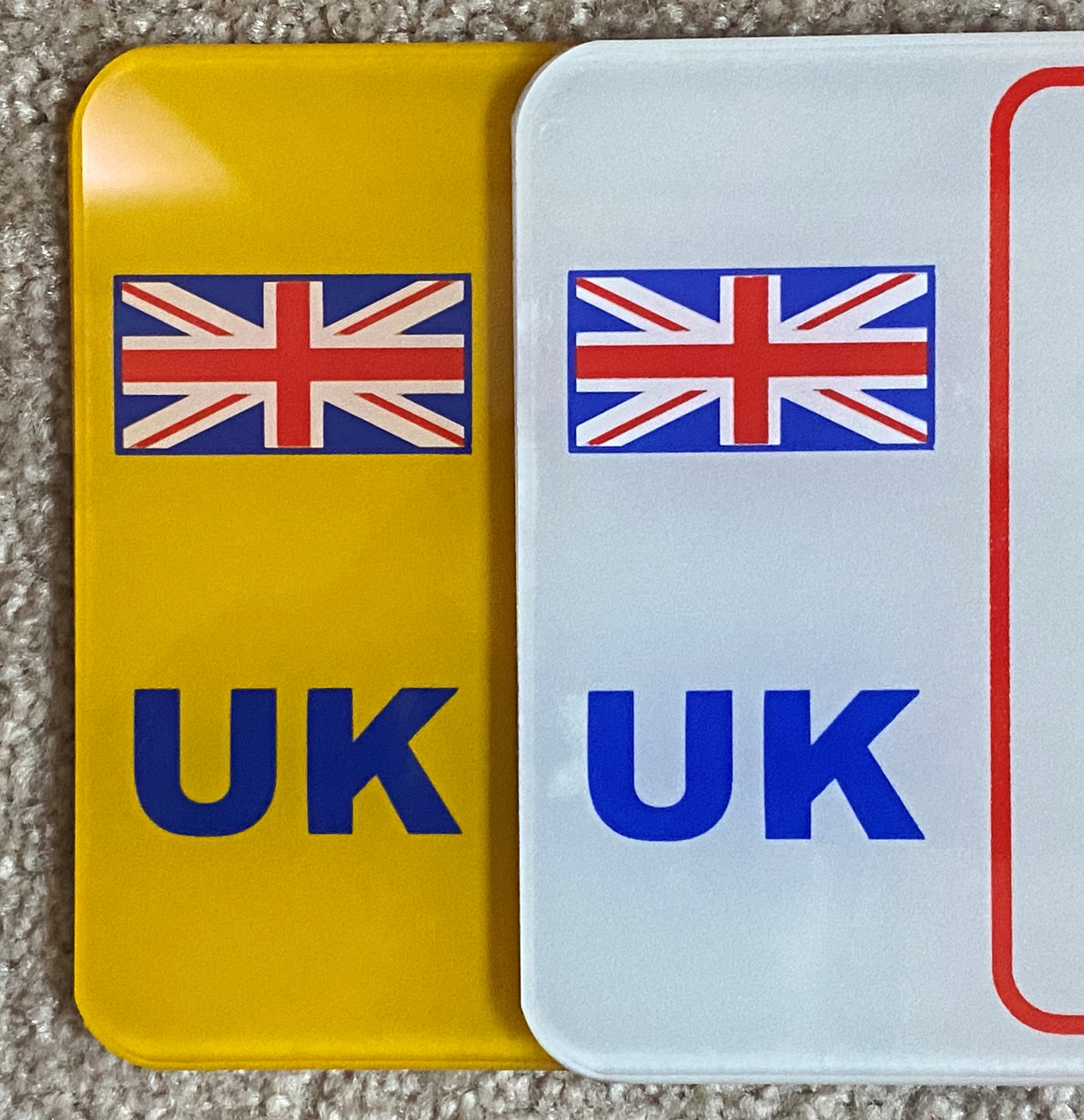
The default post-September 2021 UK National Identifier plate (text can also be black)

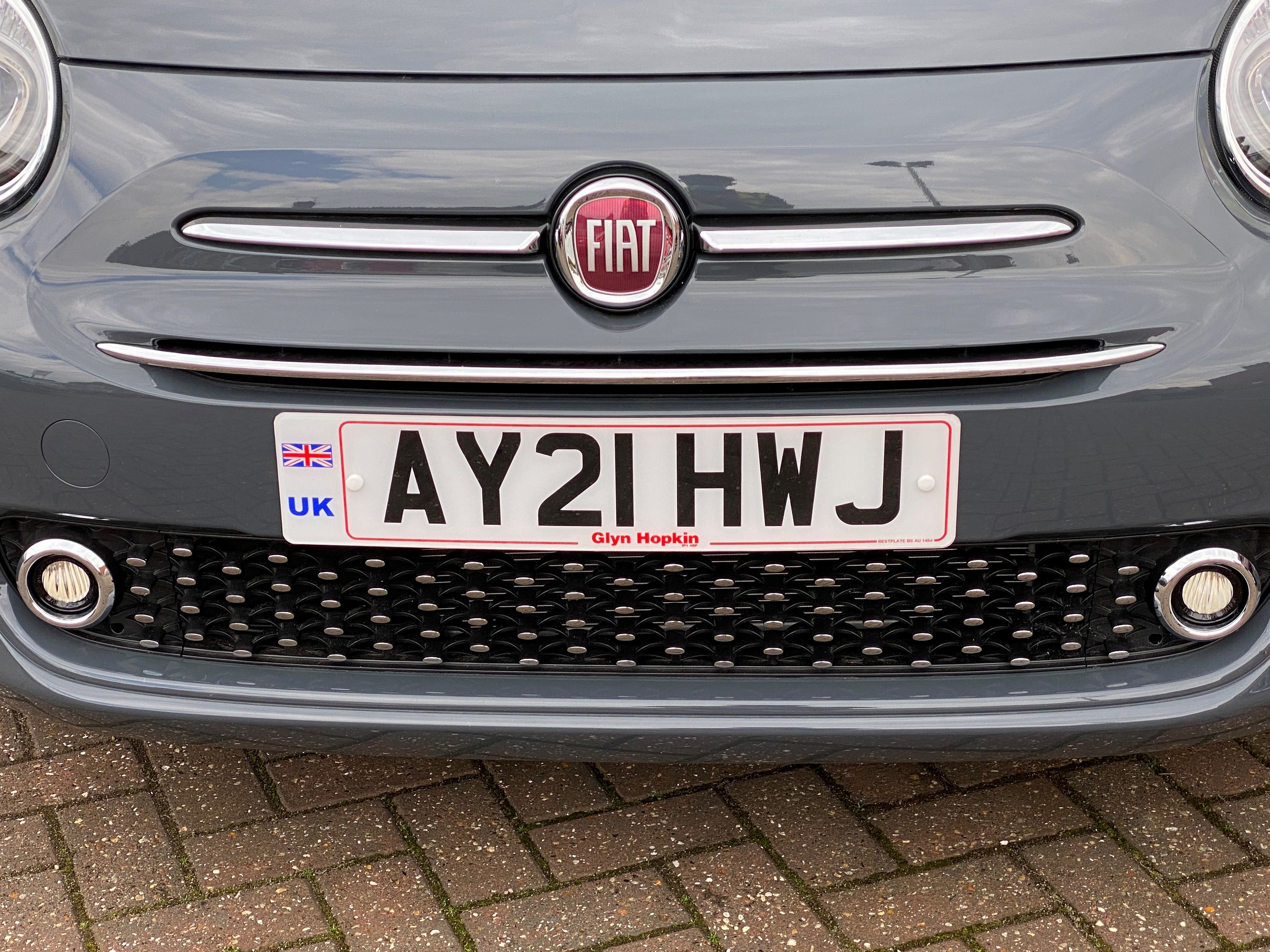
An example of a number plate with the new UK identifying badge

Examples of British registration plates with national emblems displayed
(United Kingdom)	(England)	(Scotland)	(Wales)
UK – UNITED KINGDOM – United Kingdom – GB – GREAT BRITAIN – Great Britain	ENG – Eng – ENGLAND – England	SCO – Sco – SCOTLAND – Scotland	CYM – Cym – CYMRU – Cymru – WALES – Wales

===== Flag of Europe =====
The optional GB identification band pre-Brexit

When the UK was a member state of the European Union, it was permissible (but never mandatory) to display number plates conforming to the common EU format introduced by Council Regulation (EC) No 2411/98, with a blue strip (in order to construct the background colour of the EU / Council flag) on the left side of the plate with the Flag of Europe (yellow or gold circle of stars) above the international vehicle registration code of the member state (GB). This format cannot be issued after the transition period ended.

EU member states that require foreign vehicles to display a distinguishing sign of the country of origin (e.g. "UK" for the United Kingdom) are obliged by Article 3 of EU Regulation No. 2411/98 to accept this standard design as a distinguishing sign when displayed on a vehicle registered in another member state, making a separate sign unnecessary for vehicles registered in the EU.

After Brexit, other EU countries are no longer required to accept GB "Europlates", as the regulation only requires member states to accept the standard design as a distinguishing sign when displayed on a vehicle registered in another member state. After this, GB Europlates must be replaced by a number plate that features the UK sign in order to be valid as a national identifier.

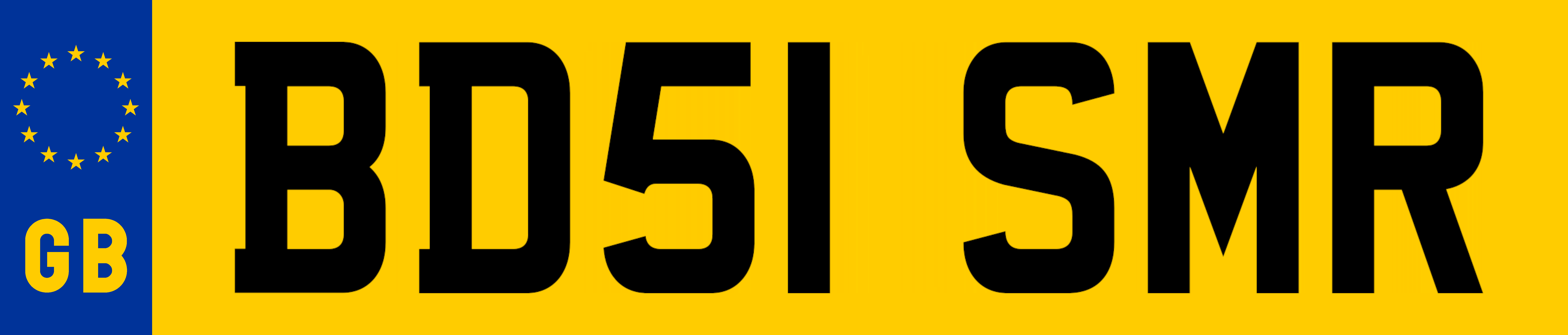
The British version of the EU standard number plate issued until the transition ended after the UK withdrew from the EU; this was optional in the UK.

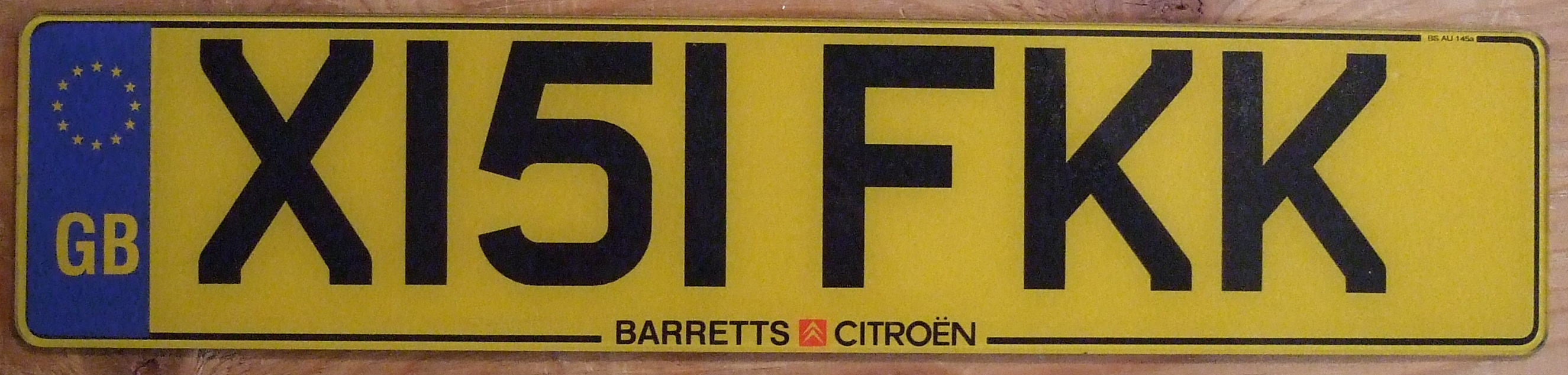
A pre-2001 UK number plate displaying the optional EU identification band.

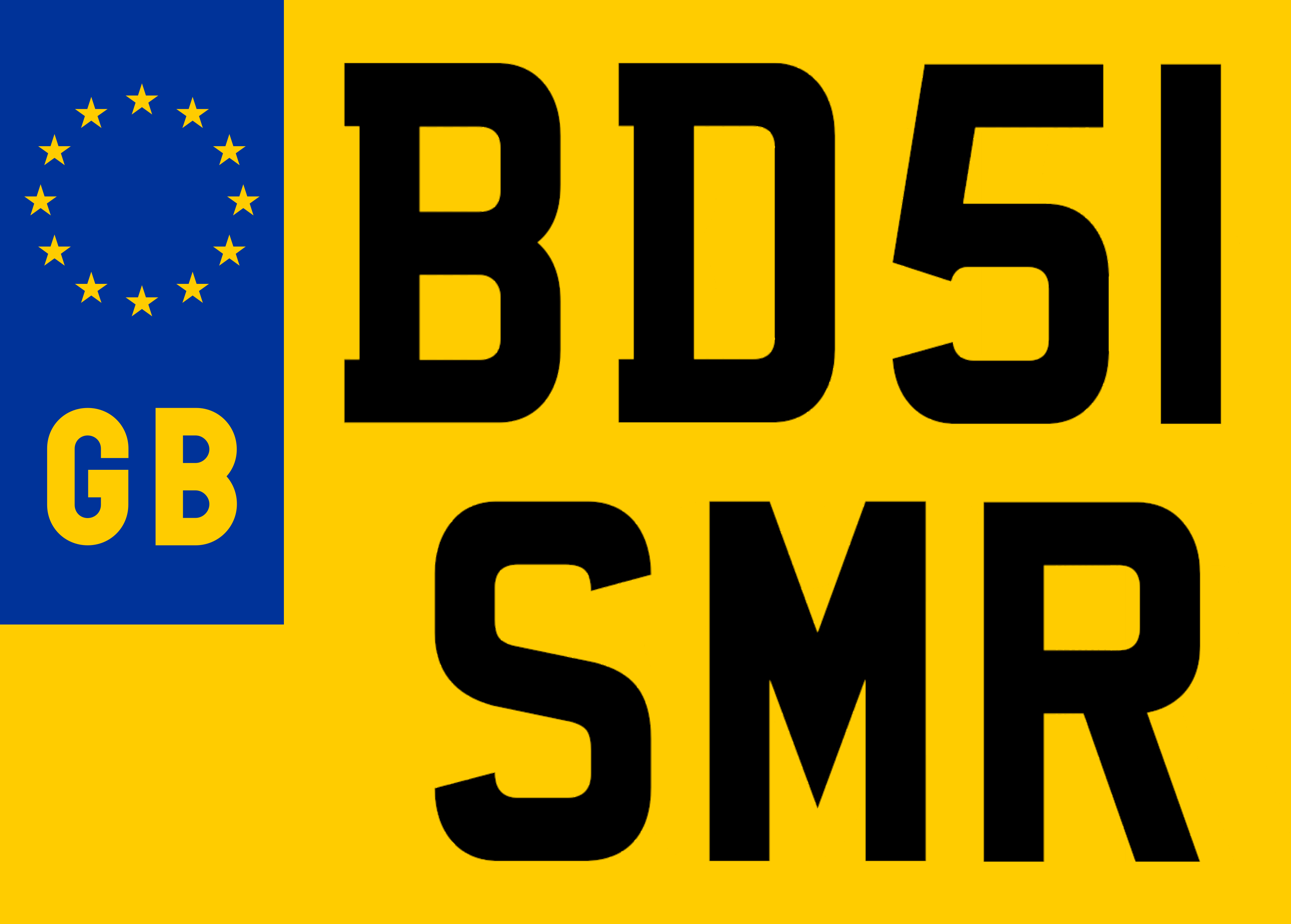
This format is used for motorcycles and other vehicles where a narrower plate is required (showing optional EU symbol).

==== Typography ====
The standard (79 mm height) typeface is set out in the Road Vehicles (Display of Registration Marks) Regulations 2001. An alternative (64 mm) font is provided for motorcycles (schedule 4 part 2, p. 24).

The standard font, Mandatory, unofficially known as Charles Wright 2001, is a subtly redrawn version of Charles Wright's original 1935 font. The width of the previous font was condensed from 57 mm to 50 mm to allow space for the extra letter and the optional blue EU strip. The letter O and the digit 0 are intentionally identical, as are the letter I and digit 1. But the typeface accentuates the differences between characters such as 8 and B, or D and 0, with slab serifs to improve the legibility of a plate from a distance. This is especially useful for the automatic number plate recognition software of speed cameras and CCTV. This accentuation also discourages the tampering that is sometimes practised with the use of black insulating tape or paint to change letter forms (such as P to R, or 9 to 8), or with the inclusion of carefully positioned black "fixing screw" dots that alter the appearance of letters on some vanity plates.

The design has similarities with the FE-Schrift number-plate font which was introduced in Germany in 1994 and which has been mandatory there since 2000. However, the UK design remains more conventional in its character shapes.

==== Special plates ====
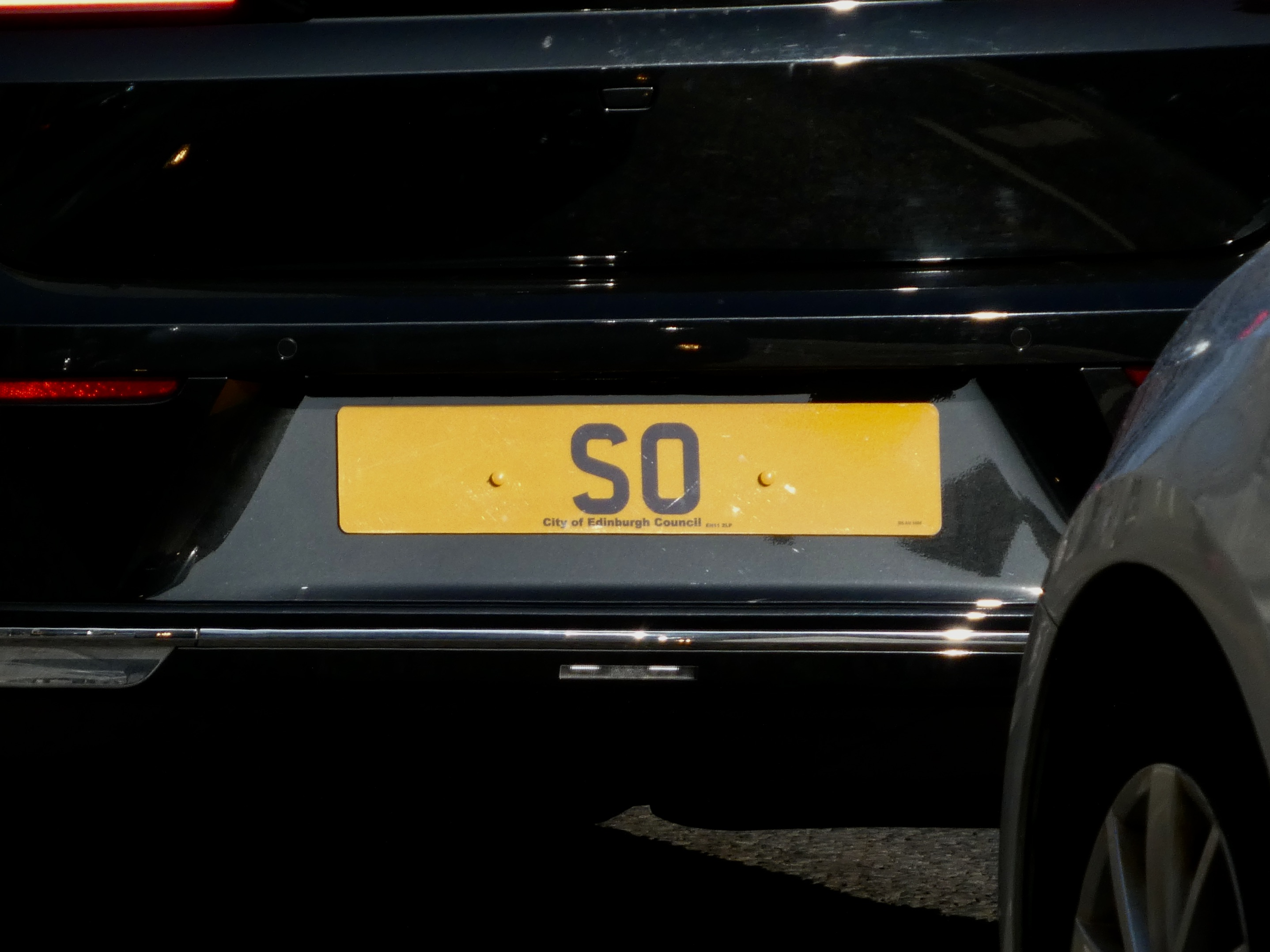
Number plate of the Lord Provost of Edinburgh, one of only eight marks in the United Kingdom in which the serial number is zero

Registrations having a combination of characters that are particularly appealing (resembling a name, for example) are auctioned each year. The first of these auctions was in 1989.

For the 07 registration period, a higher-than-usual number of Scottish 07 codes were retained as Select registrations for sale, and an additional allocation of Tx letter pairs were released for use by the local offices in Scotland with the same allocation as the Sx letter pairs (for example Edinburgh with SK to SN allocated had TK to TN added).

There are eight number plates which have a single zero - those belonging to the Lord Mayor of London (LM 0); the Lord Provost of Glasgow (G 0); the Chairman of the Strathclyde Regional Council (V 0); the Lord Provost of Edinburgh (S 0); East Renfrewshire Council (HS 0), who announced in 2023 that the number plate is for sale; the Lord Provost of Aberdeen (RG 0); Midlothian Council (SY 0) and Inverclyde Council (VS 0).

==== Green band plates ====
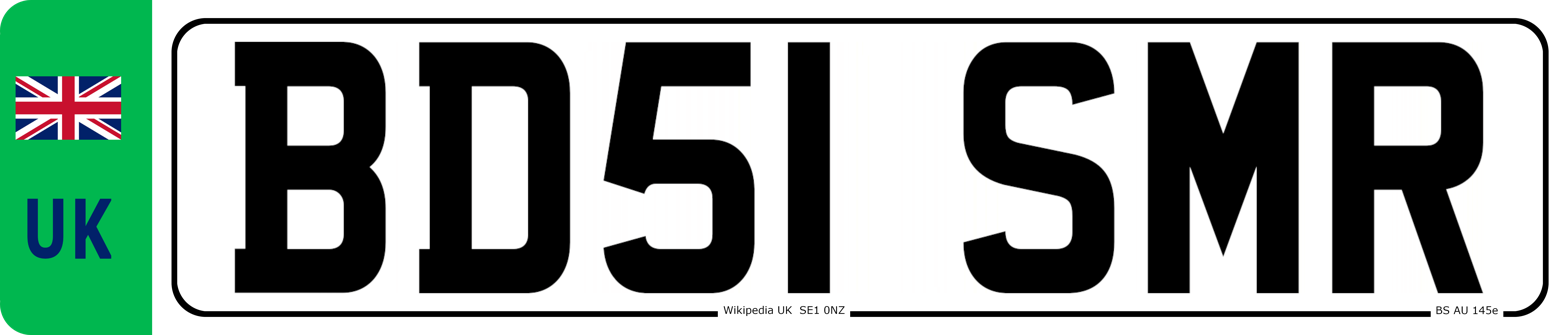
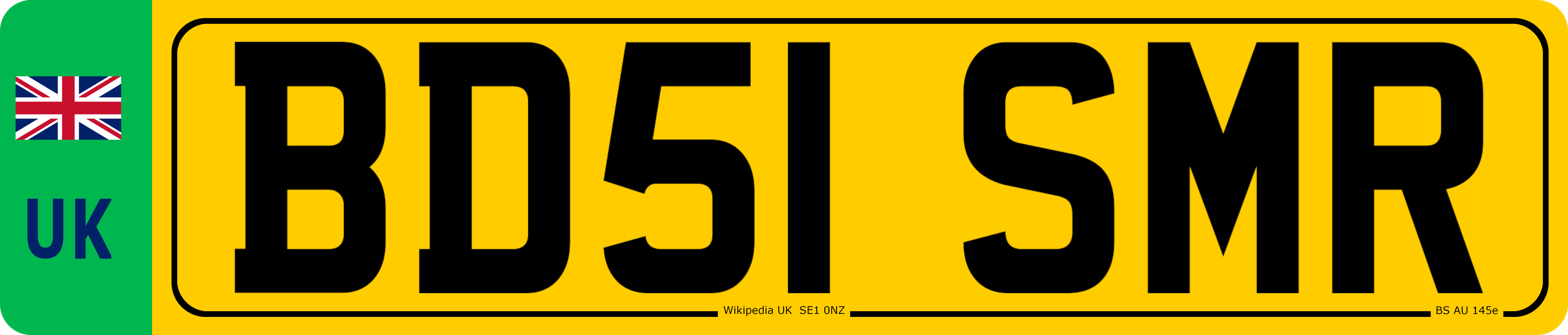
UK zero-emission vehicles front (top) and rear (bottom) number plates.
The national identifier on British number plates is optional. A "UK" code has replaced the "GB" code from 28 September 2021 and is valid in countries party to the Vienna Convention on Road Traffic if displayed on its own or together with the Union flag.

From 8 December 2020, vehicles with a Zero Emission value are allowed to display a green band on the left hand side of the plate, where the country identifier would usually sit. This is optional, and may be blank, or combined with the existing national flag options.

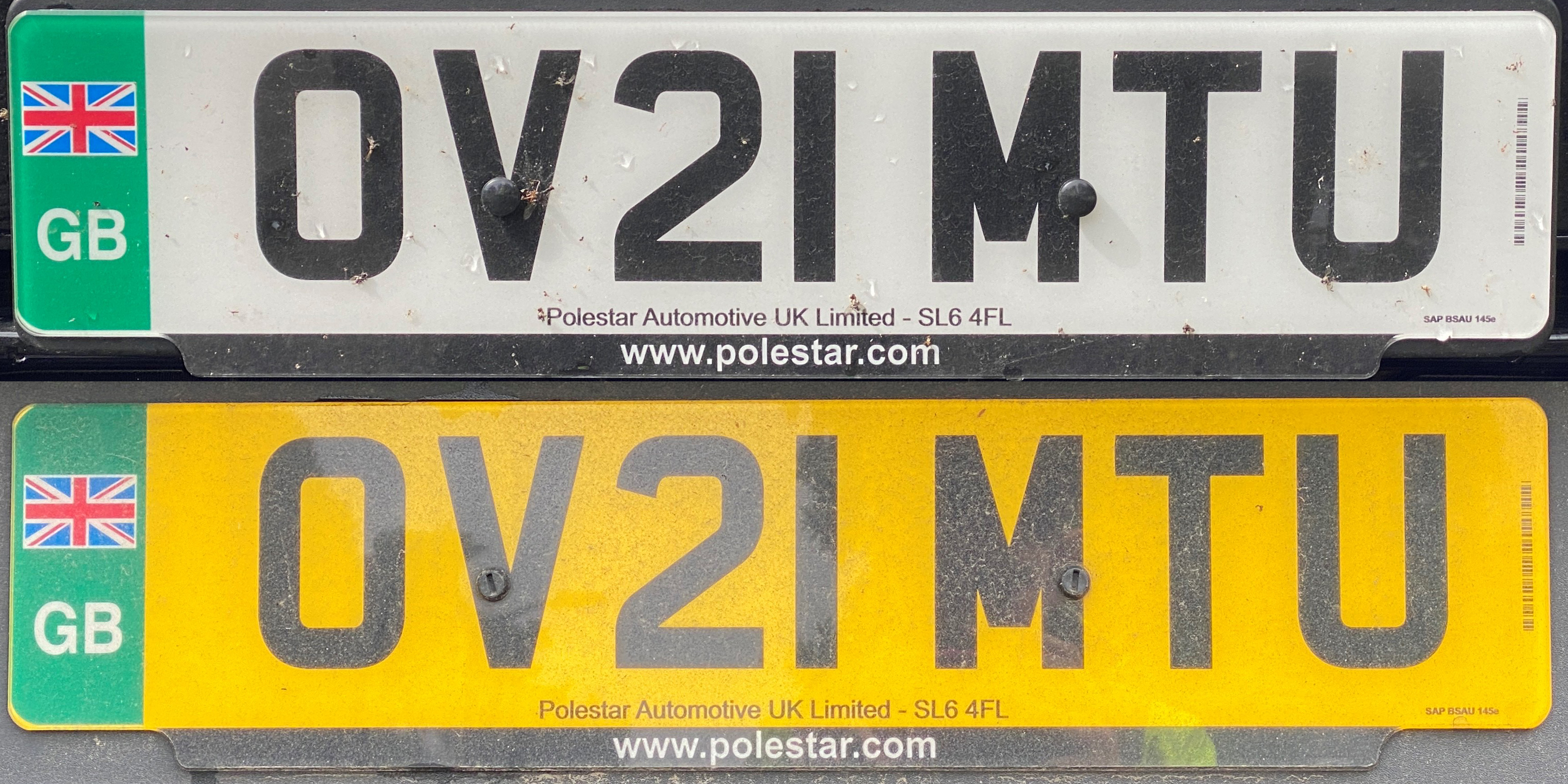
Zero Emission Vehicle Number Plate with GB Identifier

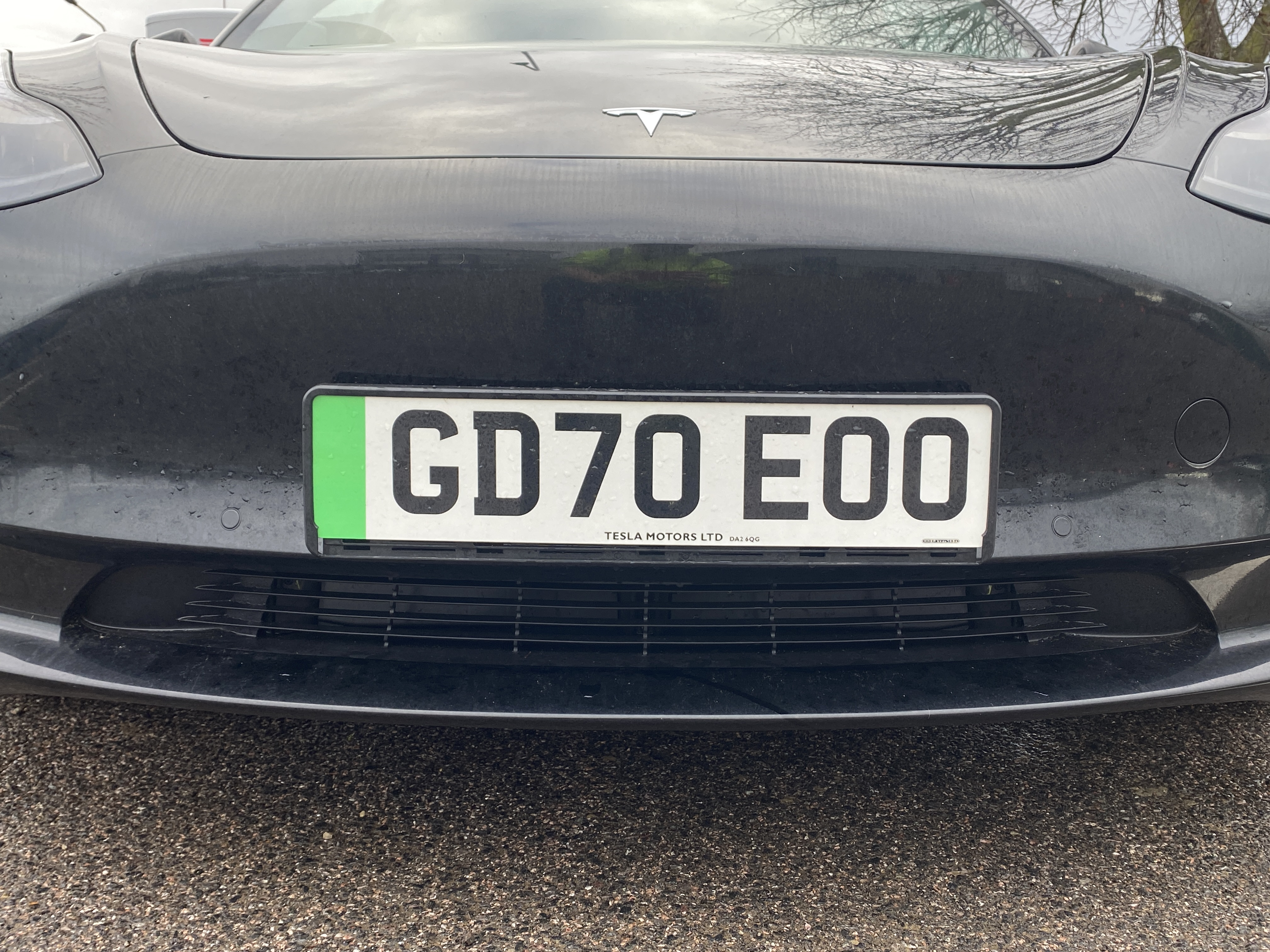
An example of the green band signifying the vehicle has zero emissions.

==== Older plates ====
Vehicles registered under previous numbering systems continue to retain their original number plates but the area identifier in the previous number system is not the same area as the post-2001 area identifier, e.g. AA pre-2001 is Bournemouth whereas AA post-2001 is Peterborough. Subject to certain conditions, number plates can be transferred between vehicles by the vehicle owner; some of these transfers involve tens or even hundreds of thousands of pounds changing hands, because of the desirability of a specific letter/number combination.

=== History ===
==== Before 1932 ====
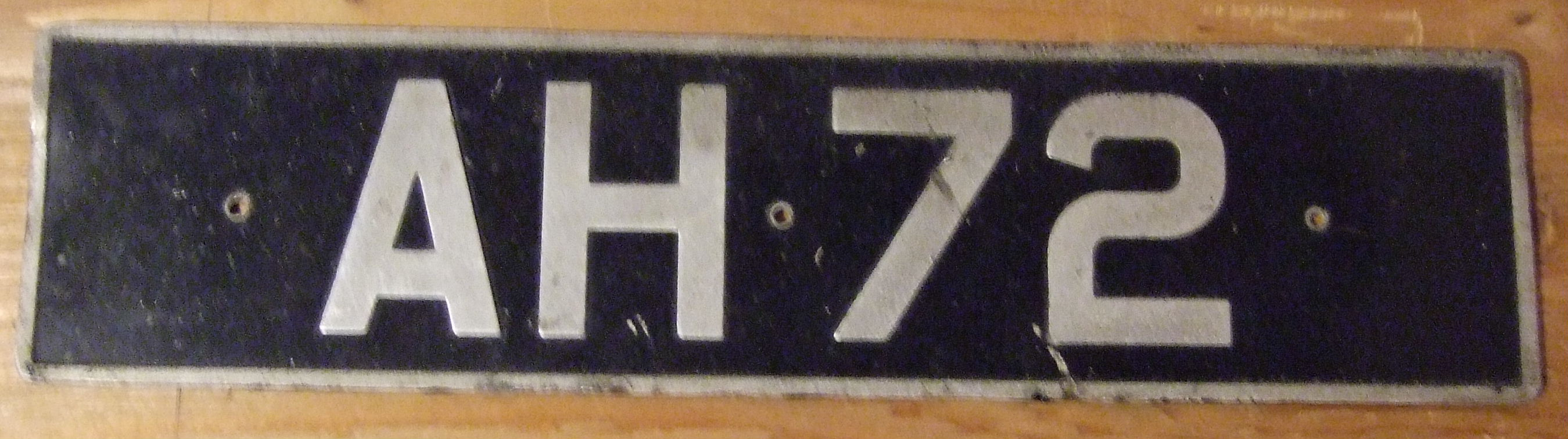
Number plate displaying a vehicle registration mark created between 1903 and 1932

The first series of number plates was issued in 1903 and ran until 1932, consisting of a one- or two-letter code followed by a sequence number from 1 to 9999. The code indicated the local authority in whose area the vehicle was registered. In England and Wales, these were initially allocated in order of population size (by the 1901 census) – thus A indicated London, B indicated Lancashire, C indicated the West Riding of Yorkshire and so on to Y indicating Somerset, then AA indicated Hampshire, AB indicated Worcestershire and so on to FP indicating Rutland.

The letters G, S and V were initially restricted to Scotland, and the letters I and Z to the whole of Ireland. In both cases, allocations of codes were made in alphabetical order of counties, followed by county boroughs – thus in Scotland, Aberdeenshire was allocated SA, Argyll received SB and so on, while in Ireland Antrim was allocated IA, Armagh received IB, and so on.

When a licensing authority reached 9999, it was allocated another two-letter code, but there was no pattern to these subsequent allocations as they were allocated on a first come first served basis. London and Middlesex quickly took most codes with L and M as the first letter respectively, while Surrey, initially allocated P, took many codes beginning with that letter.

The first mark to be issued in London was A 1. This was registered to Earl Russell. It is often stated he queued all night to obtain the registration, or he made his butler queue all night. However, the registrations were issued by the London County Council, and Russell served on that council as an Alderman from 1895 to 1904, and was the chairman of the council's highways committee.

It is also often erroneously stated that A 1 was the very first UK registration issued, but London County Council did not start issuing registrations until January 1904, whilst several licensing authorities have records of issuing registrations the previous November – Buckinghamshire (BH), Roxburghshire (KS), Somerset (Y), and the County Boroughs of Bath (FB) and Hastings (DY)

A zero has been issued by several issuing authorities for the official car of the council head, in cases where plate number "1" had already been issued by the time the councils decided to give priority to its first citizen. Example include the Lord Mayor of London (LM 0) and the Lord Provosts of Edinburgh (S 0), of Glasgow (G 0) and of Aberdeen (RG 0).

==== 1932 to 1963 ====
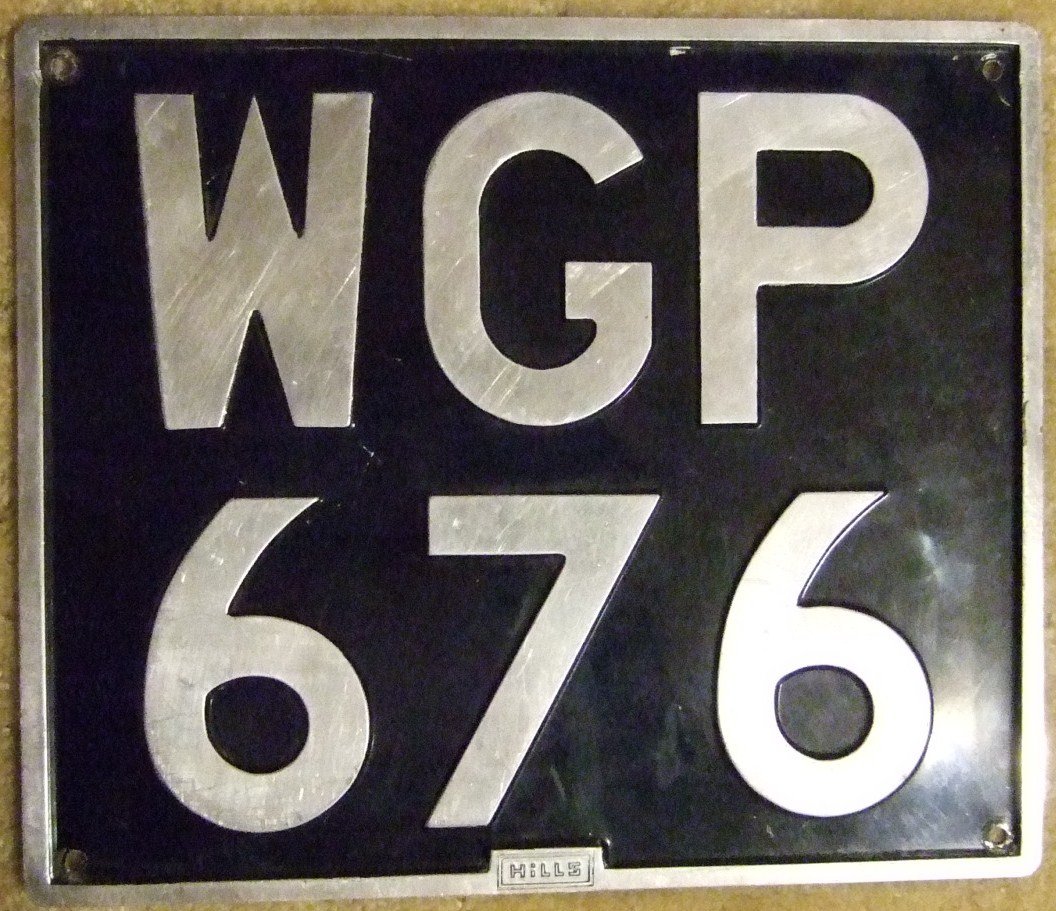
Number plate displaying a vehicle registration mark created between 1932 and 1963

By 1932, the available codes were running out, and an extended scheme was introduced. This scheme placed a serial letter before an existing two-letter code, and had the sequence number run only to 999, thus restricting the number of characters in a registration to six. The first area to issue such marks was Staffordshire in July 1932 with ARF 1 etc., and all other areas in England and Wales, plus most areas in Scotland, followed suit once they had issued all their two-letter registrations.

I, Q, and Z were not used as serial letters, as the use of I and Z continued to be restricted to Ireland and Q was reserved for temporary imports, while the single-letter codes were left out of this scheme as a serial letter would have created a duplicate of an existing two-letter code. (The Republic of Ireland and Northern Ireland later adopted this scheme in their own ways, and the latter still uses it.)

In some areas, the available marks within this scheme started to run out in the 1950s, and in those areas, what became known as "reversed" registrations – the letters coming after the numbers – were introduced. Staffordshire was again the first area to issue such registrations, starting with 1000 E in 1953. In most cases, the three-letter combinations (e.g. 1 AHX for Middlesex) would be issued first, while in later years some areas started with the one- and two-letter combinations and others issued all three at the same time. The ever-increasing prevalence of the car meant that by the beginning of the 1960s, these registrations were also running out.

Some three-letter combinations were not authorised for licensing use as they were deemed offensive. These included ARS, BUM, GOD, JEW, SEX, and SOD, sod being a mild British profanity derived from "sodomite." DUW was issued in London for several months in 1934 before it was realised it was the Welsh for God, and withdrawn.

==== 1963 to 1982 ====
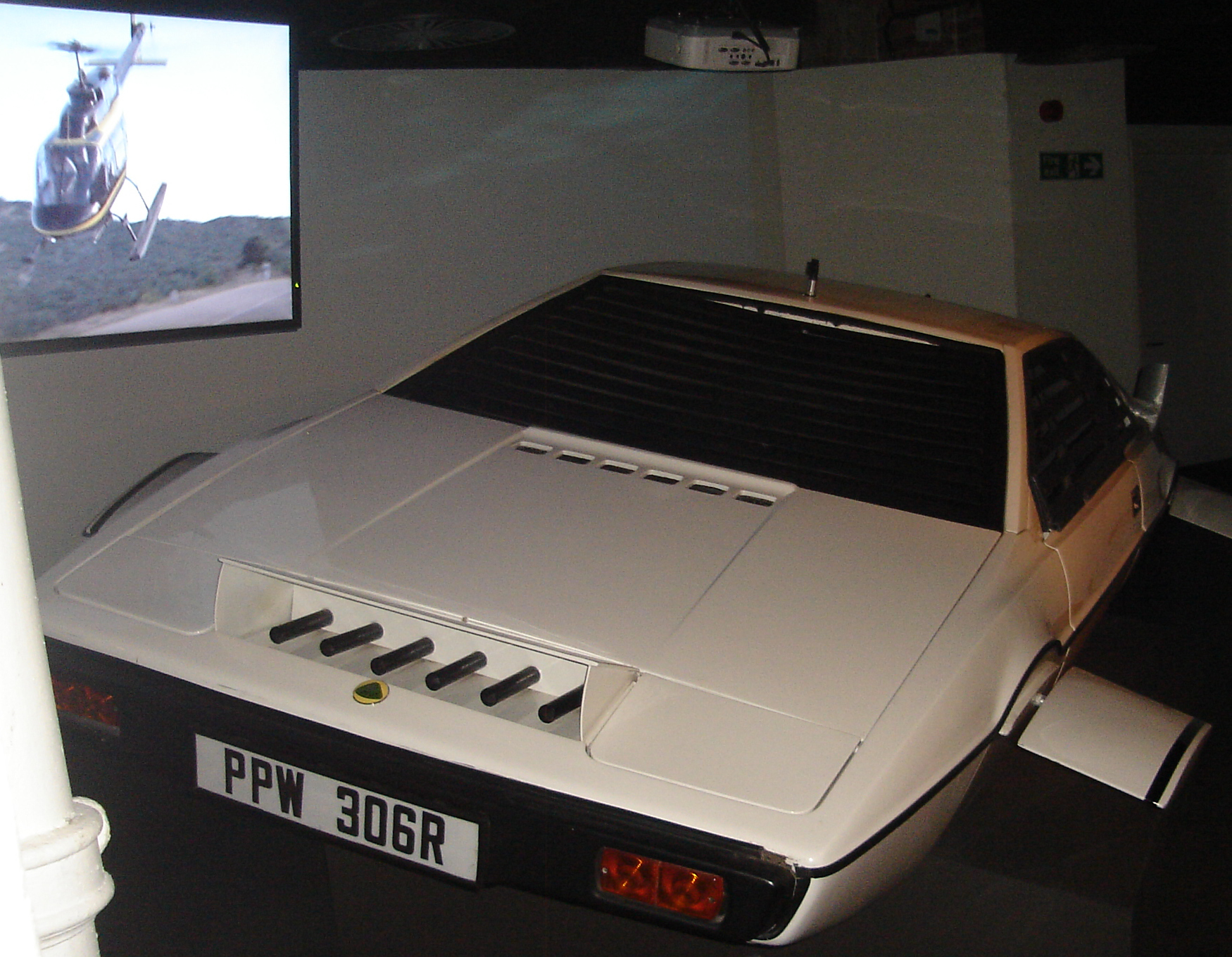
The Lotus Esprit driven by James Bond in The Spy Who Loved Me bears the plates PPW 306R. This indicates a vehicle registered between August 1976 and July 1977 (the "R" suffix) in Norwich ("PW").

In August 1962, an attempt was made to create a national scheme to alleviate the problem of registrations running out. This used the scheme introduced in 1932, of a three-letter combination followed by a sequence number from 1 to 999, but also added a letter suffix, which initially changed on 1 January each year. An "A" suffix was thus used for 1963, "B" for 1964, etc. Middlesex was the first authority to adopt this scheme when it issued AHX 1A in February 1963. Most other areas followed suit during 1964, but some chose to stick to their own schemes up until 1 January 1965, when the letter suffix was made compulsory.

As well as yielding many more available numbers, it was a way for vehicle buyers to know the age of the vehicle immediately. However, the year letter changing on 1 January each year meant that car retailers soon started to notice that buyers would tend to wait until the New Year for the new letter to be issued, so that they could get a "newer" car. This led to major peaks and troughs in sales over the year, and to help flatten this out somewhat the industry lobbied to get the scheme changed, so that the change of year letter occurred on 1 August rather than 1 January. This was done in 1967, when "E" suffixes ran only from 1 January to 31 July, before "F" suffixes commenced on 1 August.

All number plates were originally black with white, grey or silver characters, until retroreflective plates were specified in British Standard BS AU 145 in 1967. These were white on the front and yellow on the rear of the vehicle, with black characters. White/yellow retro-reflective plates became a legal requirement for most newly registered vehicles on 1 January 1973.

In October 1974, responsibility for issuing registrations was transferred from local and regional authorities to specialist Local Vehicle Licensing Offices (LVLOs) or Vehicle Registration Offices (VROs) run by the DVLA. Most of the two-letter area codes allocated during the first scheme continued in their respective areas, albeit now indicating the nearest LVLO/VRO rather than the local or regional authority. However, the decision to streamline the allocations of these codes meant that some were transferred to new areas. For instance, the former Suffolk code CF was transferred to Reading, while the former Edinburgh code WS was re-allocated to Bristol.

==== 1983 to 2001 ====
By 1982, the year suffixes had reached Y and so from 1983 onwards the sequence was reversed again, so that the year letter – starting again at "A" — preceded the numbers then the letters of the registration. The available range was then A21 AAA to Y999 YYY, the numbers 1–20 being held back for the government's proposed, and later implemented, DVLA select registration sales scheme. Towards the mid-1990s there was some discussion about introducing a unified scheme for Europe, which would also incorporate the country code of origin of the vehicle, but after much debate such a scheme was not adopted because of lack of countries willing to participate.

==== Q plates ====
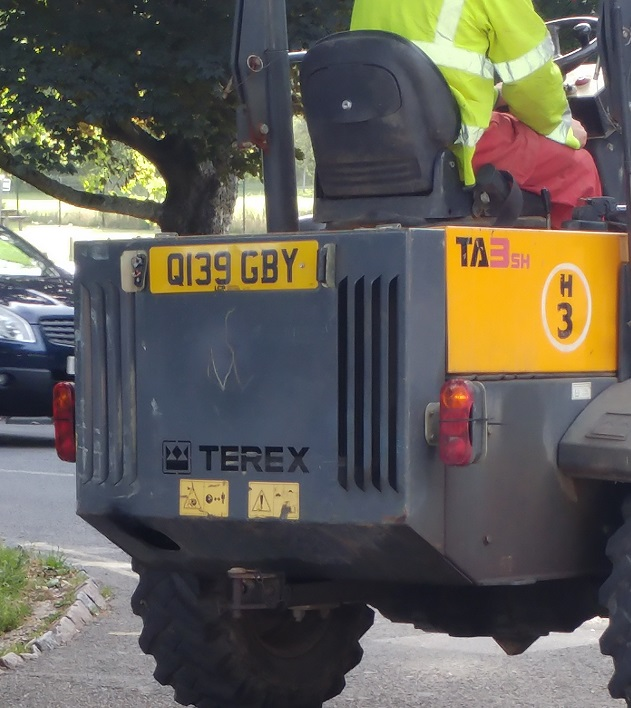
A construction vehicle bearing a Q number plate, August 2016, UK

The changes in 1983 also brought the letter Q into use – although on a very small and limited scale. It is issued for vehicles of indeterminate age, such as those assembled from kits, substantial rebuilds, or imported vehicles where the documentation is insufficient to determine the age, and this use continues for new registrations under the post-2001 system. There was a marked increase in the use of Q registrations in the late 1980s and early 1990s, fuelled by car crime. Many stolen vehicles had false identities given to them, and when this was discovered and the original identity could not be determined, a Q registration would be issued. It was seen as an aid to consumer protection. Due to the indeterminate age, origin and specification of Q registration vehicles, most motor insurers are reluctant to offer coverage for these 'Q-plate' vehicles.

==== End of the prefix system ====
By the late 1990s, the range of available numbers was once again starting to run out, made worse by a move to biannual changes in registration letters (March and September) in 1999 to smooth out the bulge in registrations every August, so a new scheme needed to be adopted. It was decided to research a system that would be easier for crash or vehicle related crime witnesses to remember and clearer to read, yet still fit within a normal standard plate size.

==== Year identifiers ====
In order to avoid any confusion, the letters I, O, U and Z have never been issued as year identifiers: I because of its similarity to the numeral 1; O because of similarity to a zero; U because of similarity to the letter V; and Z because of similarity to the numeral 2.

Suffix letter series 1963–1983
Letter	Dates of issue
A	February 1963 – 31 December 1963
B	1 January 1964 – 31 December 1964
C	1 January 1965 – 31 December 1965
D	1 January 1966 – 31 December 1966
E	1 January 1967 – 31 July 1967
F	1 August 1967 – 31 July 1968
G	1 August 1968 – 31 July 1969
H	1 August 1969 – 31 July 1970
J	1 August 1970 – 31 July 1971
K	1 August 1971 – 31 July 1972
L	1 August 1972 – 31 July 1973
M	1 August 1973 – 31 July 1974
N	1 August 1974 – 31 July 1975
P	1 August 1975 – 31 July 1976
R	1 August 1976 – 31 July 1977
S	1 August 1977 – 31 July 1978
T	1 August 1978 – 31 July 1979
V	1 August 1979 – 31 July 1980
W	1 August 1980 – 31 July 1981
X	1 August 1981 – 31 July 1982
Y	1 August 1982 – 31 July 1983

Prefix letter series 1983–2001
Letter	Dates of issue
A	1 August 1983 – 31 July 1984
B	1 August 1984 – 31 July 1985
C	1 August 1985 – 31 July 1986
D	1 August 1986 – 31 July 1987
E	1 August 1987 – 31 July 1988
F	1 August 1988 – 31 July 1989
G	1 August 1989 – 31 July 1990
H	1 August 1990 – 31 July 1991
J	1 August 1991 – 31 July 1992
K	1 August 1992 – 31 July 1993
L	1 August 1993 – 31 July 1994
M	1 August 1994 – 31 July 1995
N	1 August 1995 – 31 July 1996
P	1 August 1996 – 31 July 1997
R	1 August 1997 – 31 July 1998
S	1 August 1998 – 28 February 1999
T	1 March 1999 – 31 August 1999
V	1 September 1999 – 29 February 2000
W	1 March 2000 – 31 August 2000
X	1 September 2000 – 28 February 2001
Y	1 March 2001 – 31 August 2001

==== Pre-2001 codes ====
Normally the last two letters would indicate where the car was initially registered. The letters I and Z are reserved for Ireland. The office code (or council code until 1974) can be seen in bold letters next to the examples (ABC 123D; A123 BCD). The first two letters of the post-2001 system are not the same as the last two letters, which indicate the original district of registration for pre-2001 number plates; so, for example, pre-2001 AB is Worcester, whereas post-2001 AB is Peterborough.

For the list of Northern Ireland codes, see the Northern Ireland section of this article. For a full list of Irish codes, see Vehicle registration plates of the Republic of Ireland.

First letter	Code	County or city	Code	County or city	Code	County or city
A	A	London (1903–1964)	AA	Hampshire (1903–1974); Salisbury (1974–1980); Bournemouth (for Salisbury) (from 1980)	AB	Worcestershire (1903–1974); Worcester (from 1974)
A	AC	Warwickshire (1903–1974); Coventry (1974–1996)	AD	Gloucestershire (1903–1974); Gloucester (1974–1997)	AE	Bristol
A	AF	Cornwall (1903–1974); Truro (from 1974)	AG	Ayrshire (1925–1974); Hull (from 1974)	AH	Norfolk (1903–1974); Norwich (from 1974)
A	AJ	Yorkshire (North Riding) (1903–1974); Middlesbrough (from 1974)	AK	Bradford (1903–1974); Sheffield (from 1974)	AL	Nottinghamshire (1903–1974); Nottingham (from 1974)
A	AM	Wiltshire (1903–1974); Swindon (1974–1997); Bristol (for Swindon) (from 1997)	AN	West Ham (1903–1965); Greater London (1965–1974); Reading (from 1974); (MAN reserved for Isle of Man)	AO	Cumberland (1903–1974); Carlisle (from 1974)
A	AP	East Sussex (1903–1974); Brighton (from 1974)	AR	Hertfordshire (1903–1974); Chelmsford (from 1974)	AS	Nairnshire (1903–1974); Inverness (from 1974)
A	AT	Hull	AU	Nottingham	AV	Aberdeenshire (1926–1974); Peterborough (from 1974)
A	AW	Shropshire (1903–1974); Shrewsbury (from 1974)	AX	Monmouthshire (1903–1974); Cardiff (from 1974)	AY	Leicestershire (1903–1974); Leicester (1974–1996); Nottingham (for Leicester) (from 1996)
B	B	Lancashire (1903–1963)	BA	Salford (1903–1974); Manchester (from 1974)	BB	Newcastle upon Tyne
B	BC	Leicester (1903–1996); Nottingham (for Leicester) (from 1996)	BD	Northamptonshire (1903–1974); Northampton (from 1974)	BE	Lincolnshire (Lindsey) (1903–1974); Grimsby (1974–1981); Lincoln (for Grimsby) (from 1981)
B	BF	Dorset (1903–1905); Staffordshire (1960–1974); Stoke-on-Trent (1974–1997); Nottingham (for Stoke-on-Trent) (from 1997)	BG	Birkenhead (1931–1974); Liverpool (1974–1996)	BH	Buckinghamshire (1903–1974); Luton (from 1974)
B	BJ	East Suffolk (1903–1974); Ipswich (from 1974)	BK	Portsmouth	BL	Berkshire (1903–1974); Reading (from 1974)
B	BM	Bedfordshire (1903–1974); Luton (from 1974)	BN	Bolton (1903–1981); Manchester (for Bolton) (from 1981)	BO	Cardiff
B	BP	West Sussex (1903–1974); Portsmouth (from 1974)	BR	Sunderland (1903–1974); Durham (1974–1981); Newcastle upon Tyne (for Durham) (from 1981)	BS	Orkney (1903–1974); Kirkwall (1974–1980); Inverness (for Kirkwall) (from 1980)
B	BT	Yorkshire (East Riding) (1903–1974); York (1974–1981); Leeds (for York) (from 1981)	BU	Oldham (1903–1974); Manchester (from 1974)	BV	Blackburn (1930–1974); Preston (from 1974)
B	BW	Oxfordshire (1903–1974); Oxford (from 1974)	BX	Carmarthenshire (1903–1974); Haverfordwest (1974–1996); Swansea (for Haverfordwest) (from 1996)	BY	Croydon (1903–1965); Greater London (1965–1974); London North-West (from 1974)
C	C	Yorkshire (West Riding) (1903–1964)	CA	Denbighshire (1903–1974); Chester (from 1974)	CB	Blackburn (1903–1974); Bolton (1974–1981); Manchester (for Bolton) (from 1981)
C	CC	Caernarfonshire (1903–1974); Bangor (from 1974)	CD	Brighton	CE	Cambridgeshire (1903–1965); Cambridgeshire and Isle of Ely (1965–1974); Cambridge (1974–1980); Peterborough (for Cambridge) (from 1980)
C	CF	West Suffolk (1903–1974); Reading (from 1974)	CG	Hampshire (1931–1974); Salisbury (1974–1980); Bournemouth (for Salisbury) (from 1980)	CH	Derby (1903–1974); Nottingham (from 1974)
C	CJ	Herefordshire (1903–1974); Hereford (1974–1981); Gloucester (for Hereford) (1981–1997)	CK	Preston	CL	Norwich
C	CM	Birkenhead (1903–1974); Liverpool (1974–1996)	CN	Gateshead (1903–1974); Newcastle upon Tyne (from 1974)	CO	Plymouth (1903–1980); unused after 1980
C	CP	Halifax (1903–1974); Huddersfield (1974–1995)	CR	Southampton (1903–1974); Portsmouth (from 1974)	CS	Ayrshire (1934–1974); Ayr (1974–1981); Glasgow (for Ayr) (from 1981)
C	CT	Lincolnshire (Kesteven) (1903–1974); Boston (1974–1981); Lincoln (for Boston) (from 1981)	CU	South Shields (1903–1974); Newcastle upon Tyne (from 1974)	CV	Cornwall (1929–1974); Truro (from 1974)
C	CW	Burnley (1903–1974); Preston (from 1974)	CX	Huddersfield	CY	Swansea (SCY used for Isles of Scilly)
D	D	Kent (1903–1964)	DA	Wolverhampton (1903–1974); Birmingham (from 1974)	DB	Stockport (1903–1974); Manchester (from 1974)
D	DC	Middlesbrough (1904–1968); Teesside (1968–1974); Middlesbrough (from 1974)	DD	Gloucestershire (1921–1974); Gloucester (1974–1997)	DE	Pembrokeshire (1903–1974); Haverfordwest (1974–1996); Swansea (for Haverfordwest) (from 1996)
D	DF	Northampton (1903–1905); Gloucestershire (1926–1974); Gloucester (1974–1997)	DG	Gloucestershire (1930–1974); Gloucester (1974–1997)	DH	Walsall (1903–1974); Dudley (1974–1996)
D	DJ	St Helens (1903–1974); Warrington (1974–1981); Liverpool (for Warrington) (1981–1996)	DK	Rochdale (1903–1974); Bolton (1974–1981); Manchester (for Bolton) (from 1981)	DL	Isle of Wight (1903–1974); Newport (IoW) (1974–1981); Portsmouth (for IoW) (from 1981)
D	DM	Flintshire (1903–1974); Chester (from 1974)	DN	York (1903–1981); Leeds (for York) (from 1981)	DO	Lincolnshire (Holland) (1903–1974); Boston (1974–1981); Lincoln (for Boston) (from 1981)
D	DP	Reading	DR	Devonport (1903–1914); Plymouth (1926–1980); unused after 1980	DS	Peeblesshire (1903–1974); Glasgow (from 1974)
D	DT	Doncaster (1927–1974); Sheffield (from 1974)	DU	Coventry	DV	Devon (1929–1974); Exeter (from 1974)
D	DW	Newport (1903–1974); Cardiff (from 1974)	DX	Ipswich	DY	Hastings (1903–1980); Brighton (for Hastings) (from 1980)
E	E	Staffordshire (1903–1963)	EA	West Bromwich (1903–1974); Dudley (1974–1996)	EB	Isle of Ely (1903–1965); Cambridgeshire and Isle of Ely (1965–1974); Cambridge (1974–1980); Peterborough (for Cambridge) (from 1980)
E	EC	Westmorland (1903–1974); Kendal (1974–1981); Preston (for Kendal) (from 1981)	ED	Liverpool (Warrington until 1981)	EE	Grimsby (1903–1981); Lincoln (for Grimsby) (from 1981)
E	EF	West Hartlepool (1903–1967); Hartlepool (1967–1974); Middlesbrough (from 1974)	EG	Soke of Peterborough (1931–1965); Huntingdon and Peterborough (1965–1974); Peterborough (from 1974)	EH	Stoke-on-Trent (1903–1997); Nottingham (for Stoke-on-Trent) (from 1997)
E	EJ	Haverfordwest (Cardiganshire until 1974, Aberystwyth until 1981)	EK	Wigan (1903–1974); Warrington (1974–1981); Liverpool (for Warrington) (1981–1996)	EL	Bournemouth
E	EM	Bootle (1903–1974); Liverpool (1974–1996)	EN	Bury (1903–1974); Bolton (1974–1981); Manchester (for Bolton) (from 1981)	EO	Barrow-in-Furness (1903–1981); Preston (for Barrow-in-Furness) (from 1981)
E	EP	Montgomeryshire (1903–1974); Swansea (from 1974)	ER	Cambridgeshire (1922–1965); Cambridgeshire and Isle of Ely (1965–1974); Cambridge (1974–1980); Peterborough (for Cambridge) (from 1980)	ES	Perthshire (1903–1974); Dundee (from 1974)
E	ET	Rotherham (1903–1974); Sheffield (from 1974)	EU	Breconshire (1903–1974); Bristol (from 1974)	EV	Essex (1931–1974); Chelmsford (from 1974)
E	EW	Huntingdonshire (1903–1965); Huntingdon and Peterborough (1965–1974); Peterborough (from 1974)	EX	Great Yarmouth (1903–1974); Norwich (from 1974)	EY	Anglesey (1903–1974); Bangor (from 1974)
F	F	Essex (1903–1963)	FA	Burton upon Trent (1903–1974); Stoke-on-Trent (1974–1997); Nottingham (for Stoke-on-Trent) (from 1997)	FB	Bath (1903–1974); Bristol (from 1974)
F	FC	Oxford	FD	Dudley	FE	Lincoln
F	FF	Bangor (Merionethshire until 1974; Aberystwyth until 1981)	FG	Fife (1925–1974); Brighton (from 1974)	FH	Gloucester
F	FJ	Exeter	FK	Worcester (1903–1974); Dudley (1974–1996)	FL	Soke of Peterborough (1903–1965); Huntingdon and Peterborough (1965–1974); Peterborough (from 1974)
F	FM	Chester	FN	Canterbury (1903–1981); unused after 1981	FO	Gloucester (Radnorshire until 1974; Hereford for Radnorshire until 1981)
F	FP	Rutland (1903–1974); Leicester (1974–1996); Nottingham (for Leicester) (from 1996)	FR	Blackpool (1904–1974); Preston (from 1974)	FS	Edinburgh (from 1931)
F	FT	Tynemouth (1904–1974); Newcastle upon Tyne (from 1974)	FU	Lincolnshire (Lindsey) (1922–1974); Grimsby (1974–1981); Lincoln (for Grimsby) (from 1981)	FV	Blackpool (1929–1974); Preston (from 1974)
F	FW	Lincolnshire (Lindsey) (1929–1974); Lincoln (from 1974)	FX	Dorset (1905–1974); Bournemouth (from 1974)	FY	Southport (1905–1974); Liverpool (1974–1996)
G	G	Glasgow (1903–1963)	GA	Glasgow	GB	Glasgow
G	GC	London (1929–1974); London South-West (from 1974)	GD	Glasgow	GE	Glasgow
G	GF	London (1930–1974); London South-West (from 1974)	GG	Glasgow	GH	London (1930–1974); London South-West (from 1974)
G	GJ	London (1930–1974); London South-West (from 1974)	GK	London (1930–1974); London South-West (from 1974)	GL	Bath (1932–1974); Truro (from 1974)
G	GM	Motherwell and Wishaw (1920–1974); Reading (from 1974)	GN	London (1931–1974); London South-West (from 1974)	GO	London (1931–1974); London South-West (from 1974)
G	GP	London (1931–1974); London South-West (from 1974)	GR	Sunderland (1933–1974); Durham (1974–1981); Newcastle upon Tyne (for Durham) (from 1981)	GS	Perthshire (1928–1974); Luton (from 1974)
G	GT	London (1931–1974); London South-West (from 1974)	GU	London (1929–1974); London South-East (from 1974)	GV	West Suffolk (1930–1974); Ipswich (from 1974)
G	GW	London (1931–1974); London South-East (from 1974)	GX	London (1932–1974); London South-East (from 1974)	GY	London (1932–1974); London South-East (from 1974)
H	H	Middlesex (1903–1963)	HA	Smethwick (1907–1966); Warley (1966–1974); Dudley (1974–1996)	HB	Merthyr Tydfil (1908–1974); Cardiff (from 1974)
H	HC	Eastbourne (1911–1974); Hastings (1974–1980); Brighton (for Hastings) (from 1980)	HD	Dewsbury (1913–1974); Huddersfield (1974–1995)	HE	Barnsley (1913–1974); Sheffield (from 1974)
H	HF	Wallasey (1913–1974); Liverpool (1974–1996)	HG	Burnley (1930–1974); Preston (from 1974)	HH	Carlisle
H	HJ	Southend-on-Sea (1914–1974); Chelmsford (from 1974)	HK	Essex (1915–1974); Chelmsford (from 1974)	HL	Wakefield (1915–1974); Sheffield (from 1974)
H	HM	East Ham (1916–1965); Greater London (1965–1974); London Central (1974–1997)	HN	Darlington (1921–1974); Middlesbrough (from 1974)	HO	Hampshire (1917–1974); Salisbury (1974–1980); Bournemouth (for Salisbury) (from 1980)
H	HP	Coventry (from 1919)	HR	Wiltshire (1919–1974); Swindon (1974–1997); Bristol (for Swindon) (from 1997)	HS	Renfrewshire (1903–1974); Glasgow (from 1974)
H	HT	Bristol (from 1920)	HU	Bristol (from 1924)	HV	East Ham (1930–1965); Greater London (1965–1974); London Central (1974–1997)
H	HW	Bristol (from 1927)	HX	Middlesex (1930–1965); Greater London (1965–1974); London Central (1974–1997)	HY	Bristol (from 1930)
J	J	Durham (1903–1964)	JA	Stockport (1929–1974); Manchester (from 1974)	JB	Berkshire (1932–1974); Reading (from 1974)
J	JC	Caernarfonshire (1931–1974); Bangor (from 1974)	JD	West Ham (1929–1965); Greater London (1965–1974); London Central (1974–1997)	JE	Isle of Ely (1933–1965); Cambridgeshire and Isle of Ely (1965–1974); Cambridge (1974–1980); Peterborough (for Cambridge) (from 1980)
J	JF	Leicester (1930–1996); Nottingham (for Leicester) (from 1996)	JG	Canterbury (1929–1981); unused after 1981	JH	Hertfordshire (1931–1974); Reading (from 1974)
J	JJ	London (1932–1974); Canterbury (1974–1981); unused after 1981	JK	Eastbourne (1928–1974); Hastings (1974–1980); Brighton (for Hastings) (from 1980)	JL	Lincolnshire (Holland) (1932–1974); Boston (1974–1981); Lincoln (for Boston) (from 1981)
J	JM	Westmorland (1931–1974); Reading (from 1974)	JN	Southend-on-Sea (1930–1974); Chelmsford (from 1974)	JO	Oxford (from 1930)
J	JP	Wigan (1934–1974); Warrington (1974–1981); Liverpool (for Warrington) (1981–1996)	JR	Northumberland (1932–1974); Newcastle upon Tyne (from 1974)	JS	Ross and Cromarty (1903–1974); Stornoway (1974–1980); Inverness (for Stornoway) (from 1980)
J	JT	Dorset (1933–1974); Bournemouth (from 1974)	JU	Leicestershire (1931–1974); Leicester (1974–1996); Nottingham (for Leicester) (from 1996)	JV	Grimsby (1930–1981); Lincoln (for Grimsby) (from 1981)
J	JW	Wolverhampton (1931–1974); Birmingham (from 1974)	JX	Halifax (1932–1974); Huddersfield (1974–1995)	JY	Plymouth (1932–1980); unused after 1980
K	K	Liverpool (1903–1964)	KA	Liverpool (from 1925)	KB	Liverpool (from 1914)
K	KC	Liverpool (from 1920)	KD	Liverpool (from 1927)	KE	Kent (1920–1974); Maidstone (from 1974)
K	KF	Liverpool (from 1930)	KG	Cardiff (from 1931)	KH	Hull (from 1925)
K	KJ	Kent (1931–1974); Maidstone (from 1974)	KK	Kent (1922–1974); Maidstone (from 1974)	KL	Kent (1924–1974); Maidstone (from 1974)
K	KM	Kent (1925–1974); Maidstone (from 1974)	KN	Kent (1917–1974); Maidstone (from 1974)	KO	Kent (1927–1974); Maidstone (from 1974)
K	KP	Kent (1928–1974); Maidstone (from 1974)	KR	Kent (1929–1974); Maidstone (from 1974)	KS	Roxburghshire (1903–1974); Selkirk (1974–1980); Edinburgh (for Selkirk) (from 1980)
K	KT	Kent (1913–1974); Canterbury (1974–1981); unused after 1981	KU	Bradford (1922–1974); Sheffield (from 1974)	KV	Coventry (from 1931)
K	KW	Bradford (1926–1974); Sheffield (from 1974)	KX	Buckinghamshire (1928–1974); Luton (from 1974)	KY	Bradford (1931–1974); Sheffield (from 1974)
L	L	Glamorgan (1903–1964)	LA	London (1910–1974); London North-West (from 1974)	LB	London (1908–1974); London North-West (from 1974)
L	LC	London (1905–1974); London North-West (from 1974)	LD	London (1909–1974); London North-West (from 1974)	LE	London (1911–1974); London North-West (from 1974)
L	LF	London (1912–1974); London North-West (from 1974)	LG	Cheshire (1928–1974); Chester (from 1974)	LH	London (1913–1974); London North-West (from 1974)
L	LJ	Bournemouth (from 1929)	LK	London (1913–1974); London North-West (from 1974)	LL	London (1914–1974); London North-West (from 1974)
L	LM	London (1914–1974); London North-West (from 1974)	LN	London (1906–1974); London North-West (from 1974)	LO	London (1915–1974); London North-West (from 1974)
L	LP	London (1915–1974); London North-West (from 1974)	LR	London (1916–1974); London North-West (from 1974)	LS	Selkirkshire (1903–1974); Stirling (1974–1981); Edinburgh (for Stirling) (from 1981)
L	LT	London (1918–1974); London North-West (from 1974)	LU	London (1919–1974); London North-West (from 1974)	LV	Liverpool (from 1932)
L	LW	London (1919–1974); London North-West (from 1974)	LX	London (1919–1974); London North-West (from 1974)	LY	London (1919–1974); London North-West (from 1974)
M	M	Cheshire (1903–1963)	MA	Cheshire (1920–1974); Chester (from 1974)	MB	Cheshire (1922–1974); Chester (from 1974)
M	MC	Middlesex (1917–1965); Greater London (1965–1974); London North-East (1974–1997)	MD	Middlesex (1920–1965); Greater London (1965–1974); London North-East (1974–1997)	ME	Middlesex (1921–1965); Greater London (1965–1974); London North-East (1974–1997)
M	MF	Middlesex (1923–1965); Greater London (1965–1974); London North-East (1974–1997)	MG	Middlesex (1930–1965); Greater London (1965–1974); London North-East (1974–1997)	MH	Middlesex (1924–1965); Greater London (1965–1974); London North-East (1974–1997)
M	MJ	Bedfordshire (1932–1974); Luton (from 1974)	MK	Middlesex (1925–1965); Greater London (1965–1974); London North-East (1974–1997)	ML	Middlesex (1926–1965); Greater London (1965–1974); London North-East (1974–1997)
M	MM	Middlesex (1926–1965); Greater London (1965–1974); London North-East (1974–1997)	MN	Isle of Man	MO	Berkshire (1922–1974); Reading (from 1974)
M	MP	Middlesex (1927–1965); Greater London (1965–1974); London North-East (1974–1997)	MR	Wiltshire (1924–1974); Swindon (1974–1997); Bristol (for Swindon) (from 1997)	MS	Stirlingshire (1903–1974); Stirling (1974–1981); Edinburgh (for Stirling) (from 1981)
M	MT	Middlesex (1928–1965); Greater London (1965–1974); London North-East (1974–1997)	MU	Middlesex (1929–1965); Greater London (1965–1974); London North-East (1974–1997)	MV	Middlesex (1931–1965); Greater London (1965–1974); London South-East (from 1974)
M	MW	Wiltshire (1927–1974); Swindon (1974–1997); Bristol (for Swindon) (from 1997)	MX	Middlesex (1912–1965); Greater London (1965–1974); London South-East (from 1974)	MY	Middlesex (1929–1965); London (1965–1974); London South-East (from 1974)
N	N	Manchester (1903–1964)	NA	Manchester (from 1913)	NB	Manchester (from 1919)
N	NC	Manchester (from 1920)	ND	Manchester (from 1923)	NE	Manchester (from 1925)
N	NF	Manchester (from 1926)	NG	Norfolk (1930–1974); Norwich (from 1974)	NH	Northampton (from 1905)
N	NJ	East Sussex (1932–1974); Brighton (from 1974)	NK	Hertfordshire (1921–1974); Luton (from 1974)	NL	Northumberland (1921–1974); Newcastle upon Tyne (from 1974)
N	NM	Bedfordshire (1920–1974); Luton (from 1974)	NN	Nottinghamshire (1921–1974); Nottingham (from 1974)	NO	Essex (1921–1974); Chelmsford (from 1974)
N	NP	Worcestershire (1921–1974); Worcester (from 1974)	NR	Leicestershire (1921–1974); Leicester (1974–1996); Nottingham (for Leicester) (from 1996)	NS	Sutherland (1903–1974); Glasgow (from 1974)
N	NT	Shropshire (1921–1974); Shrewsbury (from 1974)	NU	Derbyshire (1923–1974); Nottingham (from 1974)	NV	Northamptonshire (1931–1974); Northampton (from 1974)
N	NW	Leeds (from 1921)	NX	Warwickshire (1921–1974); Dudley (1974–1996)	NY	Glamorgan (1921–1974); Cardiff (from 1974)
O	O	Birmingham (1903–1964)	OA	Birmingham (from 1913)	OB	Birmingham (from 1915)
O	OC	Birmingham (from 1933)	OD	Devon (1931–1974); Exeter (from 1974)	OE	Birmingham (from 1919)
O	OF	Birmingham (from 1929)	OG	Birmingham (from 1930)	OH	Birmingham (from 1920)
O	OJ	Birmingham (from 1932)	OK	Birmingham (from 1922)	OL	Birmingham (from 1923)
O	OM	Birmingham (from 1924)	ON	Birmingham (from 1925)	OO	Essex (1961–1974); Chelmsford (from 1974)
O	OP	Birmingham (from 1926)	OR	Hampshire (1922–1974); Portsmouth (from 1974)	OS	Wigtownshire (1903–1974); Stranraer (1974–1981); Glasgow (for Stranraer) (from 1981)
O	OT	Hampshire (1926–1974); Portsmouth (from 1974)	OU	Hampshire (1928–1974); Bristol (from 1974)	OV	Birmingham (from 1931)
O	OW	Southampton (1931–1974); Portsmouth (from 1974)	OX	Birmingham (from 1927)	OY	Croydon (1930–1965); Greater London (1965–1974); London North-West (from 1974)
P	P	Surrey (1903–1963)	PA	Surrey (1913–1974); Guildford (1974–1997); Reading (for Guildford) (from 1997)	PB	Surrey (1919–1974); Guildford (1974–1997); Reading (for Guildford) (from 1997)
P	PC	Surrey (1921–1974); Guildford (1974–1997); Reading (for Guildford) (from 1997)	PD	Surrey (1923–1974); Guildford (1974–1997); Reading (for Guildford) (from 1997)	PE	Surrey (1924–1974); Guildford (1974–1997); Reading (for Guildford) (from 1997)
P	PF	Surrey (1926–1974); Guildford (1974–1997); Reading (for Guildford) (from 1997)	PG	Surrey (1929–1974); Guildford (1974–1997); Reading (for Guildford) (from 1997)	PH	Surrey (1927–1974); Guildford (1974–1997); Reading (for Guildford) (from 1997)
P	PJ	Surrey (1931–1974); Guildford (1974–1997); Reading (for Guildford) (from 1997)	PK	Surrey (1928–1974); Guildford (1974–1997); Reading (for Guildford) (from 1997)	PL	Surrey (1930–1974); Guildford (1974–1997); Reading (for Guildford) (from 1997)
P	PM	East Sussex (1922–1974); Guildford (1974–1997); Reading (for Guildford) (from 1997)	PN	East Sussex (1927–1974); Brighton (from 1974)	PO	West Sussex (1929–1974); Portsmouth (from 1974); (GPO formerly reserved for General Post Office vehicles)
P	PP	Buckinghamshire (1923–1974); Luton (from 1974)	PR	Dorset (1923–1974); Bournemouth (from 1974)	PS	Shetland (1903–1974); Lerwick (1974–1980); Aberdeen (for Lerwick) (from 1980)
P	PT	Durham (1922–1981); Newcastle upon Tyne (for Durham) (from 1981)	PU	Essex (1923–1974); Chelmsford (from 1974)	PV	Ipswich (from 1932)
P	PW	Norfolk (1923–1974); Norwich (from 1974)	PX	West Sussex (1923–1974); Portsmouth (from 1974)	PY	Yorkshire (North Riding) (1923–1974); Middlesbrough (from 1974)
R	R	Derbyshire (1903–1964)	RA	Derbyshire (1926–1974); Nottingham (from 1974)	RB	Derbyshire (1929–1974); Nottingham (from 1974)
R	RC	Derby (1931–1974); Nottingham (from 1974)	RD	Reading (from 1928)	RE	Staffordshire (1921–1974); Stoke-on-Trent (1974–1997); Nottingham (for Stoke-on-Trent) (from 1997)
R	RF	Staffordshire (1924–1974); Stoke-on-Trent (1974–1997); Nottingham (for Stoke-on-Trent) (from 1997)	RG	Aberdeen (1928–1974); Newcastle upon Tyne (from 1974)	RH	Hull (from 1930)
R	RJ	Salford (1931–1974); Manchester (from 1974)	RK	Croydon (1922–1965); Greater London (1965–1974); London North-West (from 1974)	RL	Cornwall (1924–1974); Truro (from 1974)
R	RM	Cumberland (1924–1974); Carlisle (from 1974)	RN	Preston (from 1928)	RO	Hertfordshire (1925–1974); Luton (from 1974)
R	RP	Northamptonshire (1924–1974); Northampton (from 1974)	RR	Nottinghamshire (1925–1974); Nottingham (from 1974)	RS	Aberdeen
R	RT	East Suffolk (1925–1974); Ipswich (from 1974)	RU	Bournemouth (from 1924)	RV	Portsmouth (from 1931)
R	RW	Coventry (from 1924)	RX	Berkshire (1927–1974); Reading (from 1974)	RY	Leicester (1925–1996); Nottingham (for Leicester) (from 1996)
S	S	Edinburgh (1903–1964)	SA	Aberdeenshire (1903–1974); Aberdeen (from 1974)	SB	Argyll (1903–1974); Oban (1974–1980); Glasgow (for Oban) (from 1981)
S	SC	Edinburgh (from 1927)	SD	Ayrshire (1903–1974); Ayr (1974–1981); Glasgow (for Ayr) (from 1981)	SE	Banffshire (1903–1974); Keith (1974–1981); Aberdeen (for Keith) (from 1981)
S	SF	Edinburgh (from 1924)	SG	Edinburgh (from 1920)	SH	Berwickshire (1903–1974); Selkirk (1974–1980); Edinburgh (for Selkirk) (from 1980)
S	SJ	Bute (1903–1974); Ayr (1974–1981); Glasgow (for Ayr) (from 1981)	SK	Caithness (1903–1974); Wick (1974–1981); Inverness (for Wick) (from 1981)	SL	Clackmannanshire (1903–1974); Dundee (from 1974)
S	SM	Dumfriesshire (1903–1974); Dumfries (1974–1981); Carlisle (for Dumfries) (from 1981)	SN	Dunbartonshire (1903–1974); Dundee (from 1974)	SO	Moray (1903–1974); Aberdeen (from 1974)
S	SP	Fife (1903–1974); Dundee (from 1974)	SR	Angus (1903–1974); Dundee (from 1974)	SS	East Lothian (1903–1974); Aberdeen (from 1974)
S	ST	Inverness-shire (1903–1974); Inverness (from 1974)	SU	Kincardineshire (1903–1974); Glasgow (from 1974)	SV	Kinross-shire (1903–1974); unused after 1974
S	SW	Kirkcudbrightshire (1903–1974); Dumfries (1974–1981); Carlisle (for Dumfries) (from 1981)	SX	West Lothian (1903–1974); Edinburgh (from 1974)	SY	Midlothian (1903–1974); unused after 1974
T	T	Devon (1903–1964)	TA	Devon (1920–1974); Exeter (from 1974)	TB	Lancashire (1919–1974); Warrington (1974–1981); Liverpool (for Warrington) (1981–1996)
T	TC	Lancashire (1922–1974); Bristol (from 1974)	TD	Lancashire (1924–1974); Bolton (1974–1981); Manchester (for Bolton) (from 1981)	TE	Lancashire (1927–1974); Bolton (1974–1981); Manchester (for Bolton) (from 1981)
T	TF	Lancashire (1929–1974); Reading (from 1974)	TG	Glamorgan (1930–1974); Cardiff (from 1974)	TH	Carmarthenshire (1929–1974); Swansea (from 1974)
T	TJ	Lancashire (1932–1974); Liverpool (1974–1996)	TK	Dorset (1927–1974); Plymouth (1974–1980); unused after 1980	TL	Lincolnshire (Kesteven) (1928–1974); Lincoln (from 1974)
T	TM	Bedfordshire (1927–1974); Luton (from 1974)	TN	Newcastle upon Tyne (from 1925)	TO	Nottingham (from 1924)
T	TP	Portsmouth (from 1924)	TR	Southampton (1925–1974); Portsmouth (from 1974)	TS	Dundee
T	TT	Devon (1924–1974); Exeter (from 1974)	TU	Cheshire (1926–1974); Chester (from 1974)	TV	Nottingham (from 1929)
T	TW	Essex (1925–1974); Chelmsford (from 1974)	TX	Glamorgan (1926–1974); Cardiff (from 1974)	TY	Northumberland (1925–1974); Newcastle upon Tyne (from 1974)
U	U	Leeds (1903–1964)	UA	Leeds (from 1927)	UB	Leeds (from 1929)
U	UC	London (1928–1974); London Central (1974–1997)	UD	Oxfordshire (1926–1974); Oxford (from 1974)	UE	Warwickshire (1925–1974); Dudley (1974–1996)
U	UF	Brighton (from 1925)	UG	Leeds (from 1932)	UH	Cardiff (from 1925)
U	UJ	Shropshire (1932–1974); Shrewsbury (from 1974)	UK	Wolverhampton (1925–1974); Birmingham (from 1974)	UL	London (1929–1974); London Central (1974–1997)
U	UM	Leeds (from 1925)	UN	Denbighshire (1927–1974); Barnstaple (1974–1981); Exeter (for Barnstaple) (1981)	UO	Devon (1926–1974); Barnstaple (1974–1981); Exeter (for Barnstaple) (1981)
U	UP	Durham (1927–1981); Newcastle upon Tyne (for Durham) (from 1981)	UR	Hertfordshire (1928–1974); Luton (from 1974)	US	Govan (1903–1912); Glasgow (from 1933)
U	UT	Leicestershire (1927–1974); Leicester (1974–1996); Nottingham (for Leicester) (from 1996)	UU	London (1929–1974); London Central (1974–1997)	UV	London (1929–1974); London Central (1974–1997)
U	UW	London (1929–1974); London Central (1974–1997)	UX	Shropshire (1927–1974); Shrewsbury (from 1974)	UY	Worcestershire (1927–1974); Worcester (from 1974)
V	V	Lanarkshire (1903–1964)	VA	Lanarkshire (1922–1974); Cambridge (1974–1980); Peterborough (for Cambridge) (from 1980)	VB	Croydon (1927–1965); Greater London (1965–1974); Canterbury (1974–1981); unused after 1981
V	VC	Coventry (from 1929)	VD	Lanarkshire (1930–1974); Luton (1974–1977); unused after 1977	VE	Cambridgeshire (1928–1965); Cambridgeshire and Isle of Ely (1965–1974); Cambridge (1974–1980); Peterborough (for Cambridge) (from 1980)
V	VF	Norfolk (1927–1974); Norwich (from 1974)	VG	Norwich (from 1927)	VH	Huddersfield (1927–1995)
V	VJ	Herefordshire (1927–1974); Hereford (1974–1981); Gloucester (for Hereford) (1981–1997)	VK	Newcastle upon Tyne (from 1929)	VL	Lincoln (from 1928)
V	VM	Manchester (from 1928)	VN	Yorkshire (North Riding) (1929–1974); Middlesbrough (from 1974)	VO	Nottinghamshire (1928–1974); Nottingham (from 1974)
V	VP	Birmingham (from 1928)	VR	Manchester (from 1929)	VS	Greenock (1903–1974); Luton (from 1974)
V	VT	Stoke-on-Trent (1927–1997); Nottingham (for Stoke-on-Trent) (from 1997)	VU	Manchester (from 1930)	VV	Northampton (from 1930)
V	VW	Essex (1927–1974); Chelmsford (from 1974)	VX	Essex (1929–1974); Chelmsford (from 1974)	VY	York (1928–1981); Leeds (for York) (from 1981)
W	W	Sheffield (1903–1964)	WA	Sheffield (from 1919)	WB	Sheffield (from 1924)
W	WC	Essex (1962–1974); Chelmsford (from 1974)	WD	Warwickshire (1930–1974); Dudley (1974–1996)	WE	Sheffield (from 1927)
W	WF	Yorkshire (East Riding) (1926–1974); Sheffield (from 1974)	WG	Stirlingshire (1930–1974); Sheffield (from 1974)	WH	Bolton (1927–1981); Manchester (for Bolton) (from 1981)
W	WJ	Sheffield (from 1930)	WK	Coventry (from 1926)	WL	Oxford (from 1925)
W	WM	Southport (1927–1974); Liverpool (1974–1996)	WN	Swansea (from 1927)	WO	Monmouthshire (1927–1974); Cardiff (from 1974)
W	WP	Worcestershire (1931–1974); Worcester (from 1974)	WR	Yorkshire (West Riding) (1912–1974); Leeds (from 1974)	WS	Leith (1903–1920); Edinburgh (1934–1974); Bristol (from 1974)
W	WT	Yorkshire (West Riding) (1923–1974); Leeds (from 1974)	WU	Yorkshire (West Riding) (1925–1974); Leeds (from 1974)	WV	Wiltshire (1931–1974); Brighton (from 1974)
W	WW	Yorkshire (West Riding) (1927–1974); Leeds (from 1974)	WX	Yorkshire (West Riding) (1929–1974); Leeds (from 1974)	WY	Yorkshire (West Riding) (1921–1974); Leeds (from 1974)
X	X	Northumberland (1903–1963)	XA	London (1920–1964); Kirkcaldy (1963–1974); unused after 1974	XB	London (1920–1965); Coatbridge (1965–1974); unused after 1974
X	XC	London (1920–1964); Solihull (1964–1974); unused after 1974	XD	London (1920–1964); Luton (1964–1974); unused after 1974	XE	London (1920–1964); Luton (1964–1974); unused after 1974
X	XF	London (1921–1964); Torbay (1968–1974); unused after 1974	XG	Middlesbrough (1929–1968); Teesside (1968–1974); unused after 1974	XH	London (1921–1964); unused after 1964
X	XJ	Manchester (1932–1974); unused after 1974	XK	London (1922–1964); unused after 1964	XL	London (1922–1964); unused after 1964
X	XM	London (1922–1964); unused after 1964	XN	London (1923–1964); unused after 1964	XO	London (1923–1964); unused after 1964
X	XP	London (1923–1964); later temporary plates for vehicles being exported to Europe	XR	London (1924–1964); unused after 1964	XS	Paisley (1903–1974); unused after 1974
X	XT	London (1924–1964); unused after 1964	XU	London (1924–1964); unused after 1964	XV	London (1928–1964); unused after 1964
X	XW	London (1924–1964); unused after 1964	XX	London (1925–1964); unused after 1964	XY	London (1925–1964); unused after 1964
Y	Y	Somerset (1903–1964)	YA	Somerset (1921–1974); Taunton (1974–1997); Exeter (for Taunton) (from 1997)	YB	Somerset (1924–1974); Taunton (1974–1997); Exeter (for Taunton) (from 1997)
Y	YC	Somerset (1927–1974); Taunton (1974–1997); Exeter (for Taunton) (from 1997)	YD	Somerset (1930–1974); Taunton (1974–1997); Exeter (for Taunton) (from 1997)	YE	London (1927–1974); London Central (1974–1997)
Y	YF	London (1927–1974); London Central (1974–1997)	YG	Yorkshire (West Riding) (1932–1974); Leeds (from 1974)	YH	London (1927–1974); London Central (1974–1997)
Y	YJ	Dundee (1932–1974); Brighton (from 1974)	YK	London (1925–1974); London Central (1974–1997)	YL	London (1925–1974); London Central (1974–1997)
Y	YM	London (1925–1974); London Central (1974–1997)	YN	London (1926–1974); London Central (1974–1997)	YO	London (1926–1974); London Central (1974–1997)
Y	YP	London (1926–1974); London Central (1974–1997)	YR	London (1926–1974); London Central (1974–1997)	YS	Partick (1903–1912); Glasgow (from 1935)
Y	YT	London (1927–1974); London Central (1974–1997)	YU	London (1927–1974); London Central (1974–1997)	YV	London (1928–1974); London Central (1974–1997)
Y	YW	London (1928–1974); London Central (1974–1997)	YX	London (1928–1974); London Central (1974–1997)	YY	London (1932–1974); London Central (1974–1997)

== Northern Ireland ==
Northern Ireland
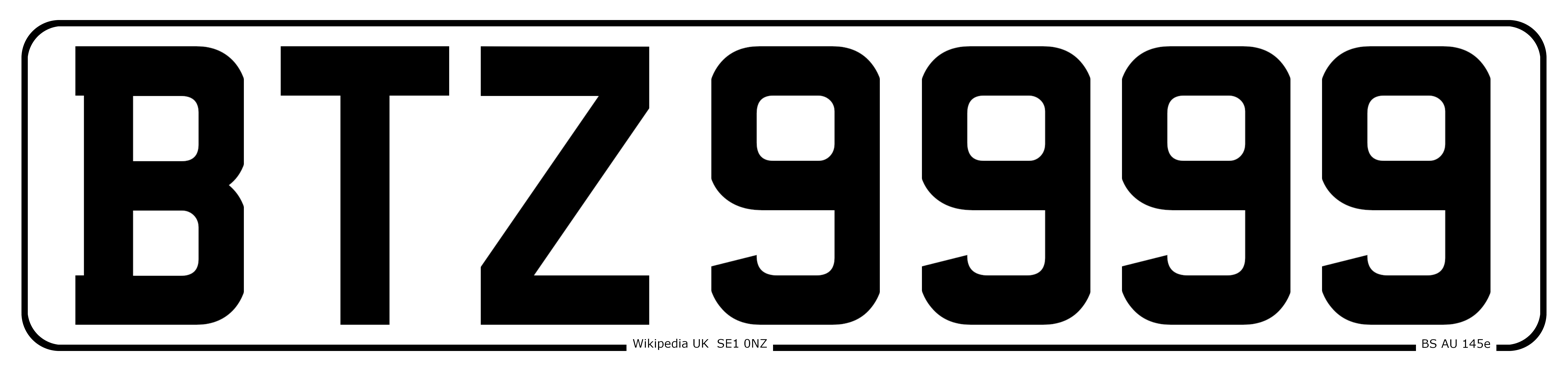

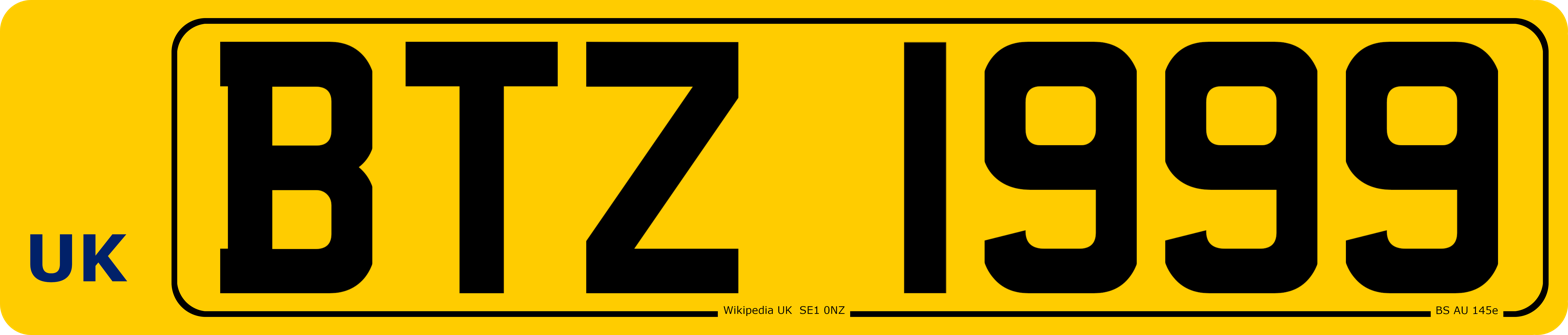
- The distinguishing code for the United Kingdom, including Northern Ireland, is "UK". Any other format displaying a side badge, including those bearing the codes "NI" or "IRL", are unofficial. Displaying the national identifier is optional.
- Country: United Kingdom
- Country code: UK

Current series
- Size: 520 mm × 111 mm 20.5 in × 4.4 in
- Serial format: AAA 1234
- Introduced: January 1966

Availability
- Issued by: DVA (until 2014); DVLA (2014-present)

History
- First issued: 1 January 1904

Northern Ireland uses a modified version of the national system initiated for the whole of the United Kingdom of Great Britain and Ireland in 1903, with two-letter county and city codes featuring the letters I or Z representing Ireland.

As in Great Britain, each code originally ran from 1 to 9999, and when one was completed, another was allocated. All possible codes had been allocated by 1957, following which reversed sequences were introduced, the first county to do so being Antrim in January 1958 with 1 IA. These reversed sequences were completed quickly, leading to the introduction of the current "AXX 1234" format in January 1966, where "XX" is the county code and "A" is a serial letter. This format allowed capacity to be increased. Each county adopted it once they had completed their reversed sequences, the last one to do so being County Londonderry in October 1973 with AIW 1. From November 1985, the first 100 numbers of each series were withheld for use as cherished registrations. From April 1989, the numbers 101-999 were also withheld in this way. Even multiples of 1000 and 1111 ("four-of-a-kind") are deemed cherished by the DVLA and thus withheld. Each series ends at 9998 and follows on to the next letter/number combination in the series.

When the administrative counties of Northern Ireland were dissolved in 1972, the responsibility for issuing registrations was transferred to the NI Ministry of Home Affairs, and later the Department of the Environment NI. From 21 July 2014, vehicle registration in Northern Ireland became the responsibility of the DVLA in Swansea. The pre-1972 format of Northern Ireland registration plates continues unchanged.

== Most expensive plates ==
As popularity grows, the prices reached for the most expensive plates have increased with many motorists attracted by the investment potential as well as vanity. In the UK, sales of private plates via the Driver & Vehicle Licensing Agency exceeded £100 million per annum for the first time in 2016. Since 1989, the DVLA has made a total of £2 billion from selling private plates. While the wealthy may spend more on a private plate than on their personal vehicle, not all car owners are attracted to private plates. This has not affected number plates from appreciating thousands in value each year.

On 7 July 2006, the registration M 1 sold for £331,500 by Bonhams at the Goodwood Festival of Speed.

On 25 January 2008, the registration F 1 sold for £440,625 to Bradford Car design entrepreneur Afzal Kahn. The plate was previously owned and sold by Essex County Council and was sold to raise money for training young drivers. Originally the plate was affixed in 1904 to the Panhard et Levassor of the then County Surveyor.

In September 2008, the registration S 1, believed to be Edinburgh's first number plate, issued in 1903, sold for £397,500 at an auction to an anonymous buyer. It was originally owned by Sir John MacDonald, the Lord Kingsburgh.

The registration 1 D sold for £352,000 in March 2009.

In November 2014, the registration 25 O broke a new record for most expensive UK registration plate sold at public auction when it was purchased for £518,440 by Ferrari dealer John Collins at a DVLA personalised plate auction.

Over a decade later, in July 2025, the registration JB 1 then shattered this record, selling for £608,600 to an internet bidder at a Bonhams auction during the Goodwood Festival of Speed.

VIP 1 (originally a Republic of Ireland plate from Kilkenny (IP)), 51 NGH, K1 NGS and 1 O are also marked as considerably expensive plates that have sold publicly in excess of six figures.

== Other formats ==
=== Armed forces vehicles ===
The number plate usually used in British Armed Forces vehicles

In the Second World War, vehicles of the British Army had number plates such as A12104 and those of the Royal Air Force RAF 208343. Since 1949, British military vehicle registration numbers are mostly either in the form of two digits, two letters, two digits (e.g. 07 CE 08), or from 1995 onwards, two letters, two digits, two letters (for example, JW 57 AB). Until the mid-1980s, the central two letters signified the armed service, or the branch or category of vehicle. For example, Chief of Fleet Support's staff car in 1983–85 was 00 RN 04, and First Sea Lord's car 00 RN 01 and Second Sea Lord's 00 RN 02, normal civilian plates replacing them when security required; and, in 1970, one of HMS Albion's Land Rovers was 25 RN 97 and HMS Bulwark's ship's minibus was 04 RN 84. Royal Air Force vehicles had numbers such as 55 AA 89, with the first of the two letters typically being A, and the new-style RAF plates, such as RZ 00 AA and RU 86 AA on fire engines.

Military number plates are still often in the silver/white on black scheme used for civilian plates before 1973, and can be presented in one, two or three rows of characters.

From before 1960 until around 1990, in West Germany, private vehicles owned by members of British Forces Germany and their families were issued registration numbers in a unique format (initially two letters followed by two digits followed by a "B" suffix (e.g. SY 47 B), later three digits plus a "B" suffix, e.g. RH 249 B, then from the early 1980s three letters followed by two numbers plus the "B" suffix, e.g. AQQ 89 B). This was discontinued for security reasons, as it made them vulnerable to Provisional IRA attacks. Private vehicles driven by British military personnel are now issued with either standard UK number plates (if right hand drive) or German ones (if left hand drive), although the vehicle is not actually registered with the DVLA.

JW 57 AB
00 RN 04
RH 249 B
AQQ 89 B
RAF 208343

=== Trade plates ===
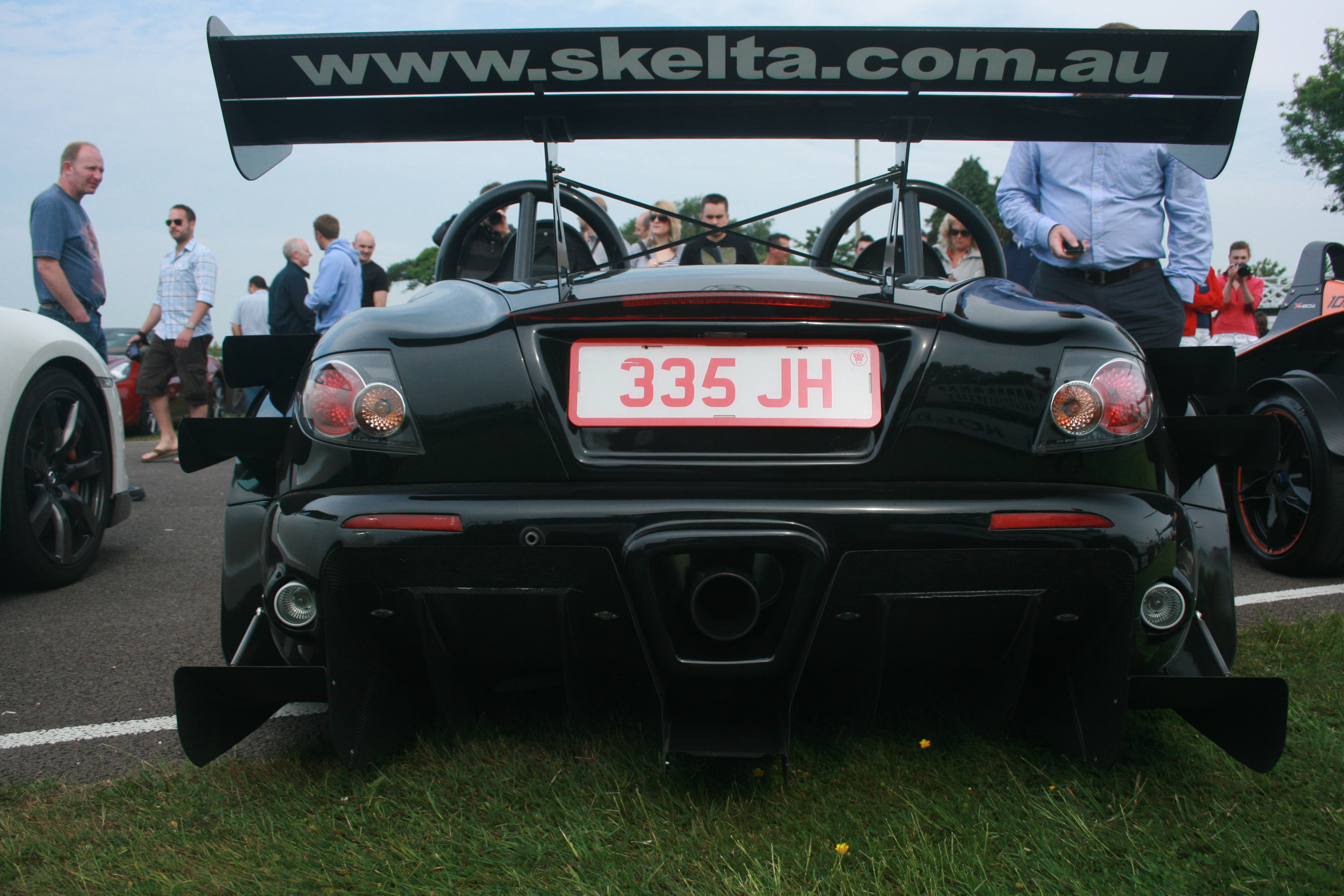
Reading-registered trade plate

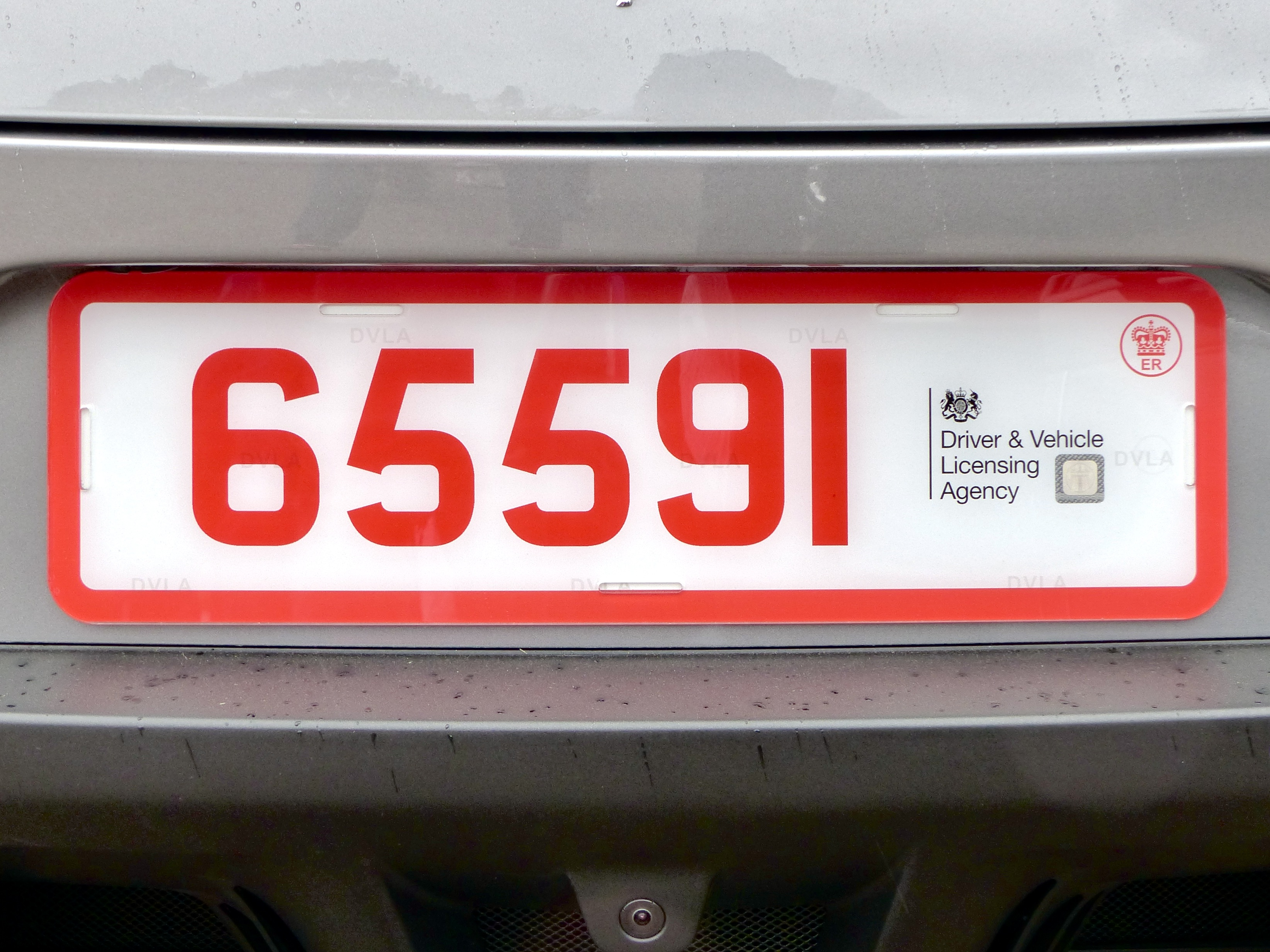
Post-2015 trade plate, Windsor, September 2016

Trade licences are issued to motor dealers and vehicle testers, (Note: "A motor dealer is defined as a person in the business of selling or supplying vehicles, that is a new or used car dealer. A motor trader is defined as: a manufacturer or repairer of vehicles; a dealer whose business consists of collecting and delivering vehicles and no other activities except as a vehicle manufacturer or repairer.; A vehicle tester is defined as a person who tests vehicles belonging to someone else." DVLA Guidance Notes VTL301G May 2020) and permit the use of untaxed vehicles on the public highway with certain restrictions. Associated with trade licences are "trade plates" which identify the holder of the trade licence rather than the vehicle they are displayed on, and can be attached temporarily to vehicles in their possession.

Until 1970, two types of trade plate were used. General trade plates had white letters and numbers on a red background and could be used for all purposes, while limited trade plates used red numbers and letters on a white background and were restricted in their use (e.g. a vehicle being driven under limited trade plates was not allowed to carry passengers). Since 1970, all trade plates have used the red-on-white format. According to the traders, the police followed a little rhyme about trade plates:

Red-on-white, stop on sight
White-on-red, go ahead.

The format of trade plate numbers consisted of either three digits (with leading zeros if necessary) followed by one, two or three letters or four digits, followed by a single letter denoting the area of issue using pre-2001 format codes.

123 ABC
123 ABC

In 2015, a new system was introduced with a number-only format. This is a five-digit number (leading zeroes used below 1000) in red on white, with a DVLA authentication at the right. This is centrally issued, and there is no regional indicator.

12345

Subsequently, due to the number of issued trade plates in the UK, the five-digit numerical only format was replaced before reaching its maximum limit of ‘99999’, with a leading letter in place of the first digit. e.g. A1234. Once the combinations of A0000 to A9999 were issued, it would roll onto the next letter of the alphabet: B0000 to B9999 and so on. Not all number combinations are issued and one cannot request specific numbers. This format is still in use and still issued centrally by the DVLA. The preceding letter does not align with a year of release or region and as a result no age or location identifier is possible. To estimate the age of a trade plate in circulation in this format; C#### plates were being issued in approx 2018 and as of 2023, H#### plates were in use.

A1234

=== Trailer registration plates ===
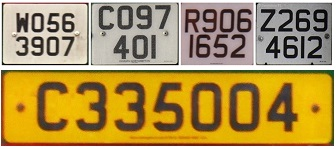
UK trailer registration plates

Since 2019, certain trailers that are being used internationally must be registered with the Driver and Vehicle Licensing Agency (DVLA) and display a unique registration number. This applies to:

- all commercial use trailers that weigh over 750 kg in gross weight
- all non-commercial use trailers that weigh over 3,500 kg in gross weight

These trailers only need to be registered if they are travelling through a country abroad that has signed up to the 1968 Vienna Convention on Road Traffic. To date, the Republic of Ireland, Malta, Spain and Cyprus have not yet signed up to this convention. Once a trailer has been registered with the DVLA, it will be allocated a unique registration number that must be displayed on the trailer. These registration numbers are a way of identifying UK-registered trailers that are being driven internationally. This will help to ensure ease of travel while abroad. The format of the trailer registration number is one letter followed by seven numbers, which are set out over two lines.

Trailer registration numbers must be correctly displayed on number plates as set out in the Trailer Registration Regulations 2018. These regulations govern how trailer registration number plates are designed and displayed. It is an offence for the registration number to be obscured in any way that makes it difficult to read. For example, one should not use fixing bolts to change the letter or any of the numbers. Anyone who has a number plate that does not display the registration number correctly could be fined up to £1,000.

=== Diplomatic vehicle registration plates ===
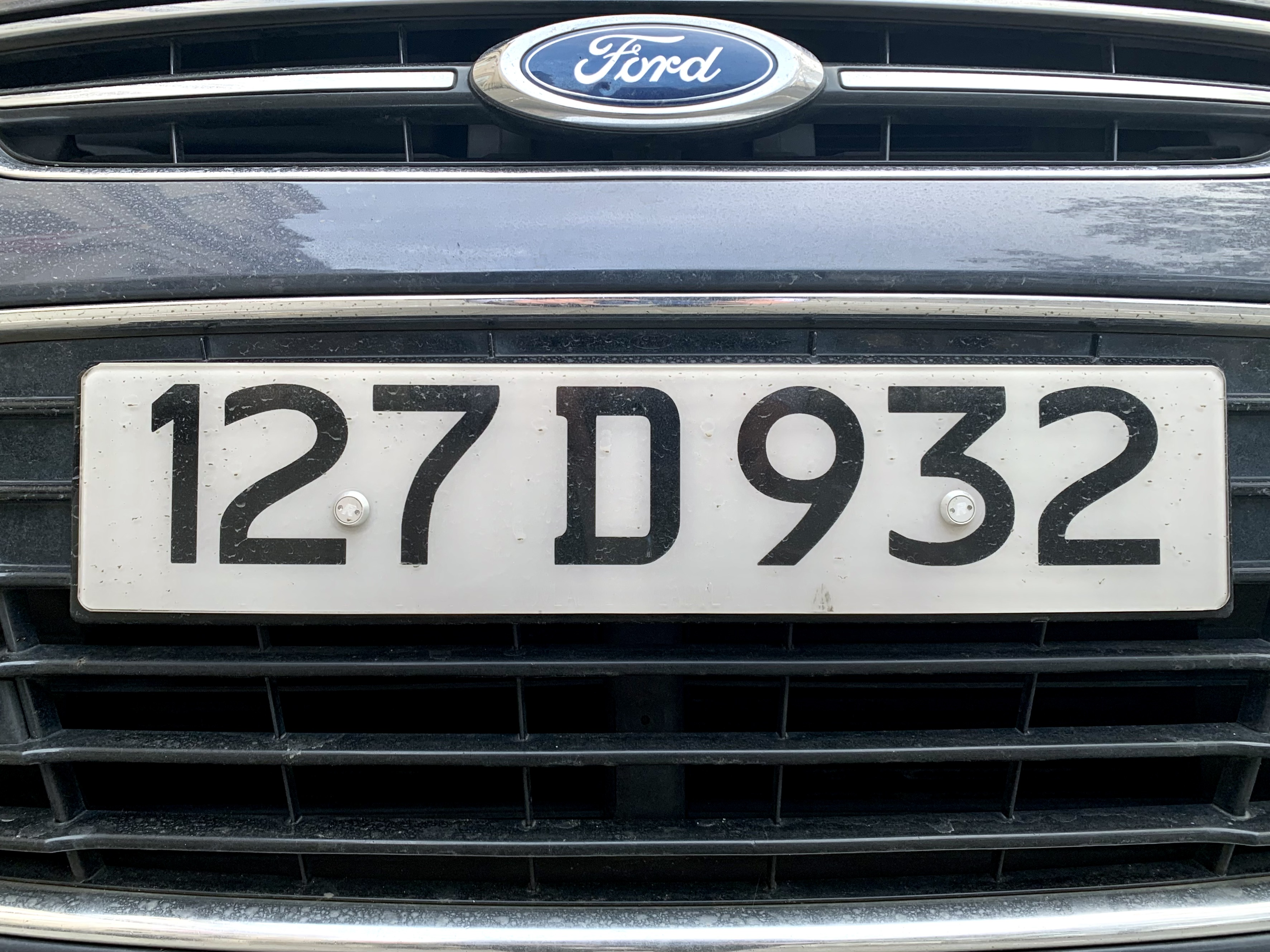
Diplomatic car number plate in 1990–2014 typeface. The 127 code shows it is registered to the Canadian embassy and the D shows it belongs to diplomatic staff.

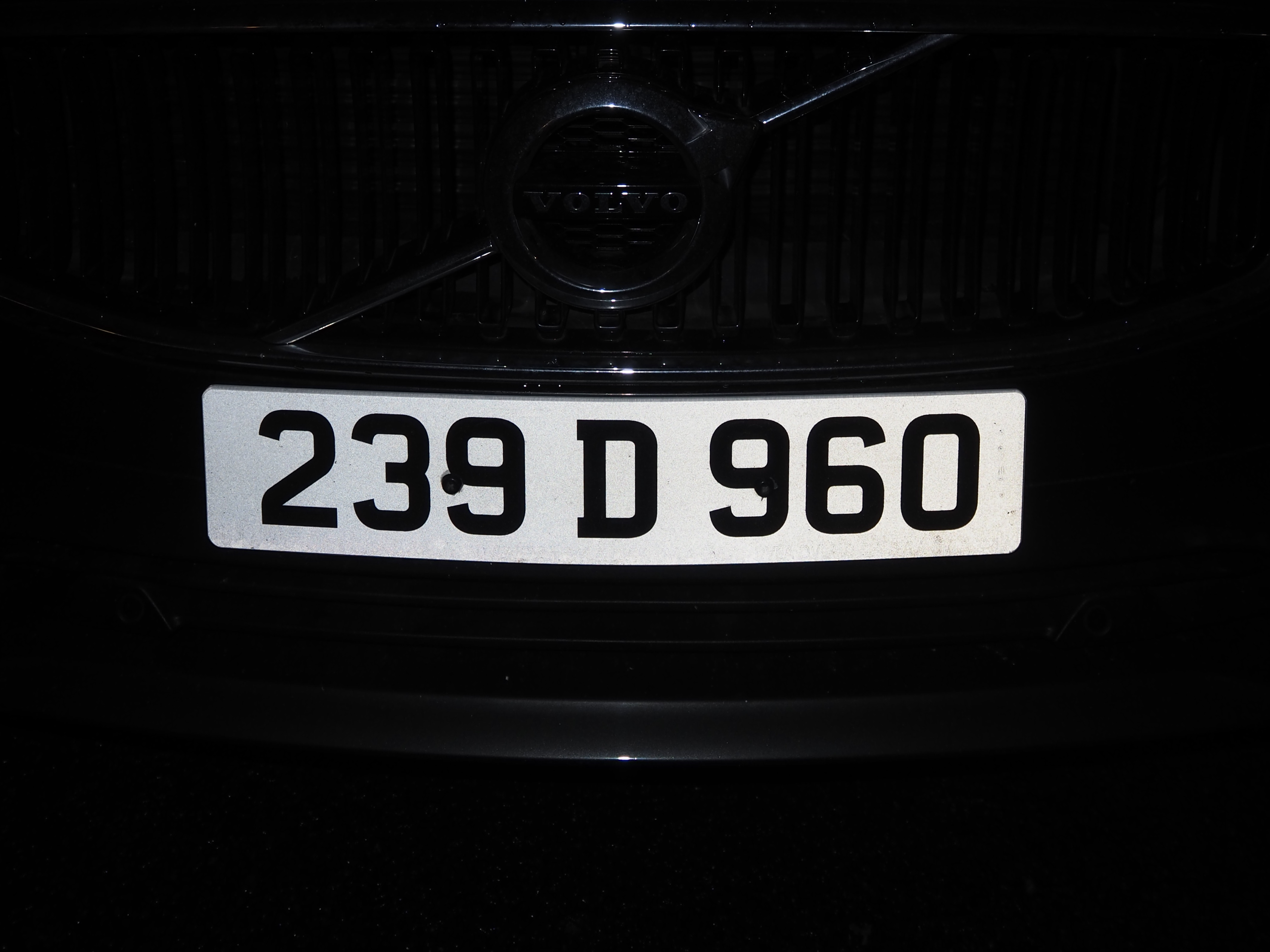
Diplomatic car number plate in current typeface. The 239 code shows it is registered to the Saudi Arabian embassy and the D shows it belongs to diplomatic staff.

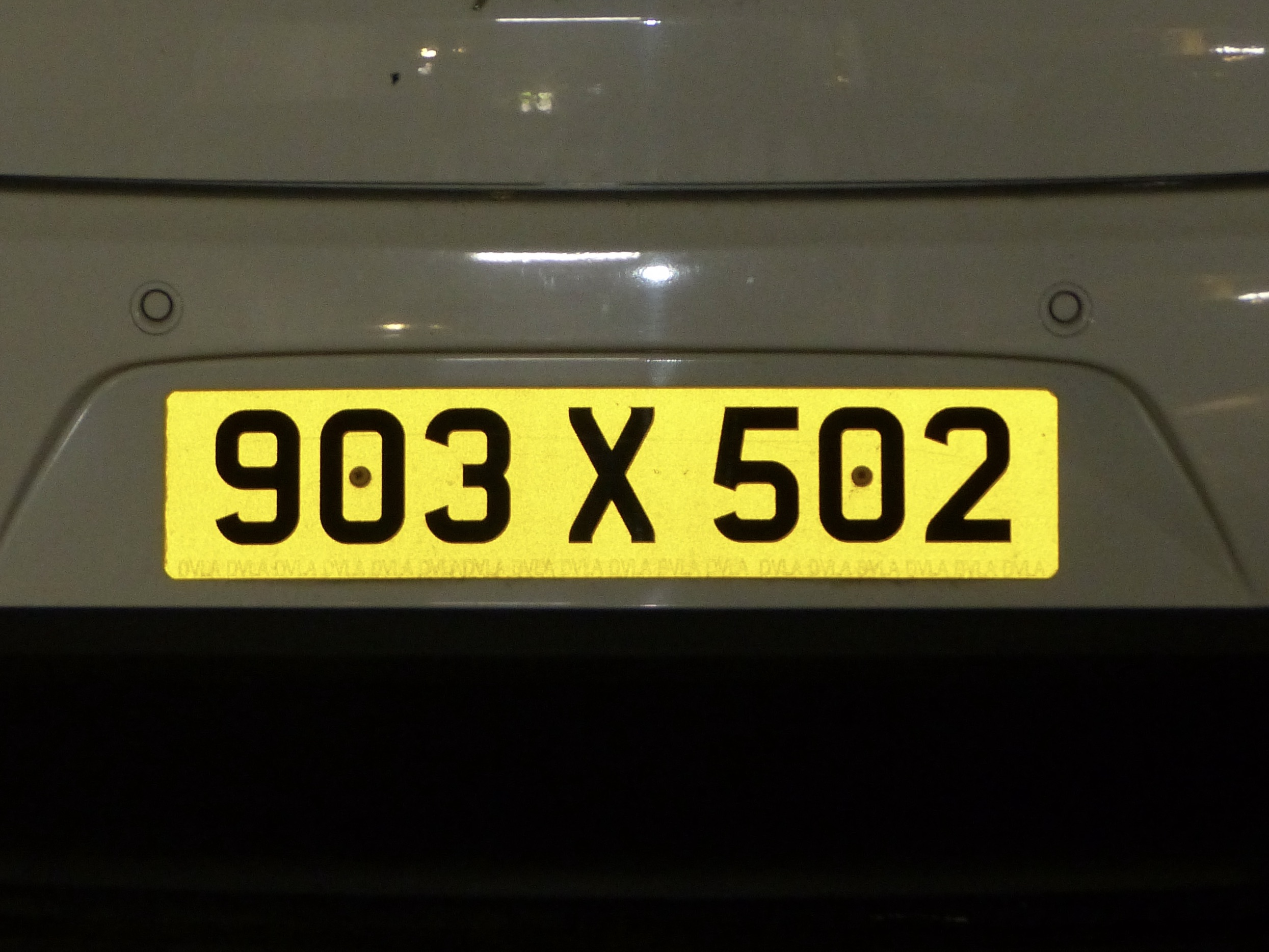
Diplomatic number plate for non-governmental organization. The 903 code shows it is registered to the European Centre for Medium-Range Weather Forecasts and the X shows it belongs to non-diplomatic staff.

Since 1979, cars operated by foreign embassies, high commissions, consulates and international organisations are issued unique vehicle registration marks. Eligible officials are required to be accredited by the Foreign & Commonwealth Office (FCO) who liaise with Specialist Registrations at the Driver & Vehicle Licensing Agency (DVLA) for issuance. Guidance document: INF267 (4/18) has been produced by the DVLA for accredited officials.

The distinguishing format is three digits, space, letter D or X, space and three digits. The first three-digit number identifies the country or international organisation. The second three-digit number is a serial number sequence starting at 101 for diplomats, 400 for non-diplomatic staff of international organisations, and 700 upwards for consular or other non-diplomatic staff. For example: 101 D 101 identifies the first registration allocated to the Afghanistan embassy and 900 X 400 is a registration allocated to the Commonwealth Secretariat.

101 D 101	101 D 101
900 X 400	900 X 400

Honorary consuls are not entitled under UK law to diplomatic vehicle registrations and/or diplomatic driving permits.

A limited number of "flag" registrations, bearing a similar format to earlier civilian registrations, have been issued to embassies and high commissions for use instead of a "D" or "X" registration on its vehicles. For example: United States' embassy is allowed to use the registration USA 1; Zimbabwe's embassy ZIM 1; Jamaica's high commission JAM 1 and South Korea's embassy ROK 1 – 'Republic of Korea'. The North Korean embassy, however, had to buy a vanity plate: PRK 1D.

Diplomats are exempt from payment of vehicle tax.

=== Cherished marks (personal, vanity or private number plates) ===
By default, a UK registration plate will accompany a vehicle throughout the vehicle's lifetime. There is no requirement to re-register a vehicle when moving to a new part of the country and no requirement that the number be changed when ownership of the vehicle changes. It is, however, possible for another registration number to be transferred, replacing the one originally issued, where owners wish to have a "vanity plate" (sometimes also referred to as a cherished, private or personalised registration/number plate) displaying, for instance, their initials. Registration numbers may also be replaced simply to disguise the actual age of the vehicle.

According to information on the government DVLA website:

"Just remember you can make your vehicle look as old as you wish but you can not make it look newer than it is. For example you cannot put a Y registration number on a T registered vehicle but you could choose any prefix range from an A to a T. Each registration has an issue date which is what you must check to ensure you don't make your vehicle appear newer than it is." However, one is able to put 1955 registered private number plates on a 1949 registered vehicle as there is no year indicator to determine the age of release.

As many vehicles registered before 1963 have been scrapped, some of their "dateless" pre-1963 registration numbers have been transferred to other vehicles and used as personalised number plates. They can be valuable, and can also be used to conceal the age of an older vehicle. Many vintage and classic cars no longer bear their original index marks due to the owners being offered high premiums for the desirable registrations. In addition Northern Irish registrations are also regarded as "dateless" and are often transferred to vehicles outside Northern Ireland. Touring coaches often operate in other parts of the UK with registration numbers originally issued in Northern Ireland.

The DVLA's Personalised and private Registrations service also allows the purchase and transfer of registration numbers directly from the DVLA. Many private dealers act as agents for DVLA issues (and sell DVLA numbers for more than the DVLA asking price, which many buyers do not realise); however, dealers also hold their own private stock of dateless registrations and other cherished marks which are not available from the DVLA. The DVLA can only offer for sale registrations that have never previously been issued and thus have a limited offering and limited scope. The DVLA do not buy or sell previously issued registrations.

=== Banned and withdrawn number plate combinations ===
Over the years many combinations have been withdrawn from issue by the DVLA to avoid offence. KKK, ASS, GOD, BUM, SEX, BNP, ARS, DAM, and also COVID-19-related number plates such as 'CO22 ONA', 'CO22 RNA', and 'CO22 VD*' were all withdrawn.

=== UK personalised and private number plate dealers ===
There are many dealers that have emerged in the UK, buying and selling personalised/private number plates. In the days before the Internet, dealers would advertise lists of plates in publications such as The Sunday Times, Exchange and Mart and Auto Trader. Obviously space would be limited and costly. Nowadays dealers have websites which of course have huge databases and access to millions of personalised number plates. Some dealers hold their own stock, advertise DVLA stock and sell on behalf of the public via agency basis. There are trade associations/governing bodies such as the CNDA (the Cherished Numbers Dealers Association), MIRAD (Members Institute Registration Agents & Dealers) and the CNG (the Cherished Numbers Guild). Most dealers are members of at least one association with an aim to enhance customer confidence. Members are advised of government and DVLA changes, sometimes members oppose changes.

A brief definition of labels used: a "private number plate" would generally be one that is not personal to the user, an example would be XX11 or OO 11 (although unlikely initials, they might still be attractive and very different from the standard issue). A "personalised number plate" would be personal to the user or driver, the driver's name or initials, examples being S1 MON or SH 1. The term "cherished number plate" is less used than in previous years.

=== State vehicles used by the reigning monarch ===
Motor cars used by the reigning monarch on official business, which are (as of 2017) all Rolls-Royces or Bentleys built to special specifications, do not carry number plates. The monarch's private vehicles carry number plates.

=== Other registration plates ===
- Tax free export in 1970s had red borders around the plate (the yellow/white plates). The Black and Silver plates had a yellow border (the standard plate had a white border).
- United Kingdom American Exchange plates had the prefix "UKAX".
- Some Republic of Ireland number plates have been registered in various motor tax offices in the UK. These plates dated from 1903 to 1986 and the UK practice of non-reregistration was discontinued in 1990. For example, VIP 1 was originally registered to a Jaguar in Co. Kilkenny (IP) Ireland in 1971 and then was on a Rolls-Royce Corniche owned by former Chelsea Football Club owner Roman Abramovich. Some UK embassy vehicles have I or Z in their number plates e.g. CZE (Dublin) 1, PHI (Tipperary) 1, which have originated in the Irish system. Vehicles registered in Ireland under the new system (87 onwards) and which are exported to the UK must de-register their new Irish county (or in many cases, their Irish export ZZ 5 digit plate) with the DVLA who will issue them with a new UK number.

== Fraudulent use ==
Criminals sometimes use copies of number plates legitimately used on a vehicle of identical type and colour to the one used, known as "cloning", to avoid being identified. A routine police computer check shows the plate matching the type of vehicle and does not appear suspicious.

The UK Government introduced on 1 August 2008 regulations requiring the production of personal identification and vehicle registration documents when having number plates made by a retailer. The organisation that makes the plate is required to display their name and postcode, usually in small print at bottom centre, to aid in tracing false plates and their purchaser. This requirement was introduced in 2001 when the new character style and two-digit year identifier came into force, and applies to all registration plates made after that date regardless of the year of the vehicle.

== Registration plate suppliers ==
Number plates were initially made by the motor vehicle's original supplier, and replacement plates meeting standards could be made by anybody. Some people had street address numbers made up to motor-vehicle standards for their houses. From 2001, plates sold in England and Wales had to be provided by a supplier on the DVLA's Register of Number Plate Suppliers (RNPS) as specified in British Standard BSAU145d. The supplier needs to confirm that the customer is the registered keeper or other authorised person and verify their identity. The name and postcode of the supplier must be shown at the bottom of the plate. Number plates in the UK are usually flat and made of plastic; embossed aluminium plates are available from some suppliers. These rules are generally described as onerous, particularly to company car drivers who do not hold any of the required paperwork themselves (such items usually being stored by a fleet manager or lease hire company).

Registered number plate suppliers must keep records including the documents produced by their customers; these can be required to be shown to the police, although that has seldom happened. The Department for Transport holds a full list of suppliers.

Some companies, particularly those based online, sell number plates described as "show plates" or "not for road use", which may not satisfy the requirements of BSAU145e. However, if so specified, these products can be identical to number plates sold by approved RNPS registered supplier. Many of these companies do not ask customers to prove ownership of the registration they are purchasing, and try to circumvent the law by placing disclaimers on their websites. Despite these disclaimers, it is still not legal to produce any registration plates without seeing proof of identity of the purchaser (such as a driving licence), and proof of their connection to the registration (such as a V5C or retention certificate).

== Registration plate styles ==
The British Standards BSAU145a through to BSAU145d did not necessarily state the type of materials which were needed to manufacture UK registration plates. Some manufacturers opted for metallic materials; however, as technology advanced, most switched to the use of plastics. In the earlier days, the characters of number plates were raised. Manufacturers would produce digits made from metal as well as plastic, and these would be fastened to the flat substrate using methods such as riveting. Metal press technology also improved, meaning that the plate could be made from a single sheet of aluminium, or an aluminium blend, on which dies would be used to press the shape of the characters.

Material and equipment costs led to the development of the flat plastic plate which had a reflective backing. Transfers would then be lined up on to the reflective material, and then a plastic sheet would be laminated on top, encapsulating the characters in place. This was still a labour-intensive method, and required an artistic eye to ensure the digits were not misaligned.

Further advances in the field saw modifications being made to thermal printers in order to print the registration mark directly on to the reflective backing sheet.

== See also ==
- Vehicle Excise Duty
- Vehicle registration plate
- Vehicle registration plates of the British Overseas Territories
- European vehicle registration plate
- Vehicle registration plates of the Bailiwick of Guernsey
- Vehicle registration plates of Jersey
- Vehicle registration plates of the Isle of Man
