= Vehicle registration plates of the Cayman Islands =

British Overseas Territory of the Cayman Islands
- Country: Cayman Islands
- Country code: None

Current series
- Slogan: None
- Size: 152 mm × 300 mm 6.0 in × 11.8 in
- Colour (front): Black on white
- Colour (rear): Black on white

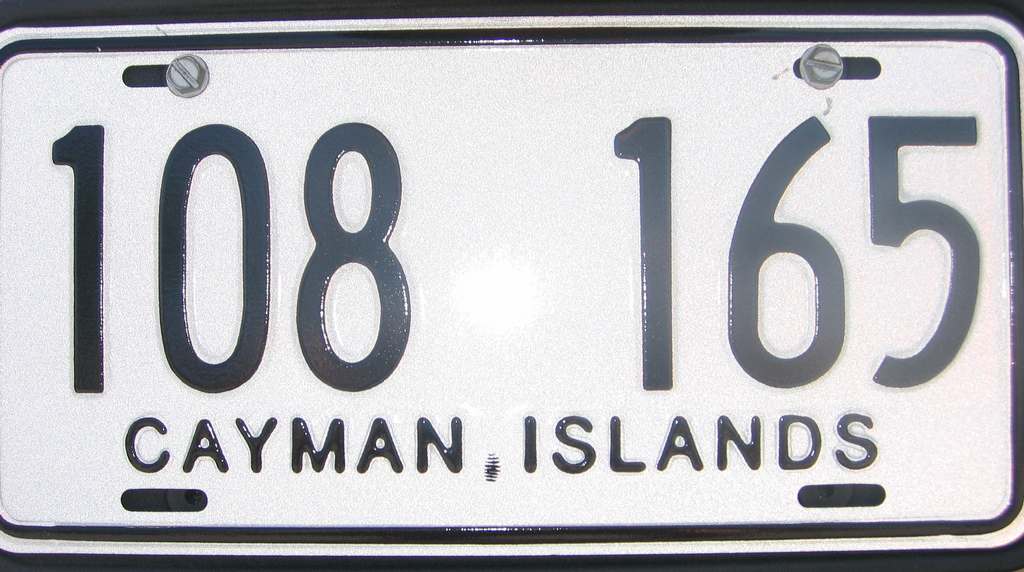
Cayman Islands plate on a hired motorbike.

The Cayman Islands requires its residents to register their motor vehicles and display vehicle registration plates. Vehicle plates usually have six numbers on them, separated into groups of three. Most plates have "Cayman Islands" written beneath the numbers and are North American standard 6.0 in × 11.8 in (152 mm × 300 mm).

In 2003, quincentennial plates (known as Q-plates) were issued; they had four blue numbers following a "Q" on a background depicting a picturesque Cayman scene with celebratory logos. Initially, Q-plates were issued with white characters, but these were recalled and replaced.

Image	First issued	Design	Serial format	Serials issued	Notes
CI 1234		White on black	AB 1234		Standard plate
		Black on orange	123 456		Heavy goods vehicles and trailers
		Red on white	123 456		Taxis
123 456		Red on yellow	123 456		Disabled drivers
123 456		Black on white	123 456		Hire cars
123 456		Black on yellow	123 456		Private cars
		Crown emblem on black	—N/a		The governor's car has a crown on a black plate on the front only.
		Black on yellow	12345		Private cars

== See also ==
- Vehicle registration plates of British overseas territories
