= Vehicle registration plates of Bermuda =

British Overseas Territory of Bermuda
- Bermudan regular legal standard number plate.
- Country: Bermuda
- Country code: None

Current series
- Size: 152 mm × 300 mm 6.0 in × 11.8 in
- Serial format: Not standard
- Colour (front): Black on white
- Colour (rear): Black on white

Vehicle registration plates of Bermuda use either the European standard 520 mm × 110 mm (for most plates) and North American standard 6 in × 12 in (152 mm × 300 mm) sized plate (for personalized plates).

Since 1975 Bermudian licence plates issued to general passenger vehicles have five black digits on a plain white background (both front and rear). Non-private vehicles have plates with one or two preceding letters followed by three or four numbers.

Personalised plates allow motorists to choose up to seven characters, overlaid on a map of the island with "Bermuda" printed across the top.

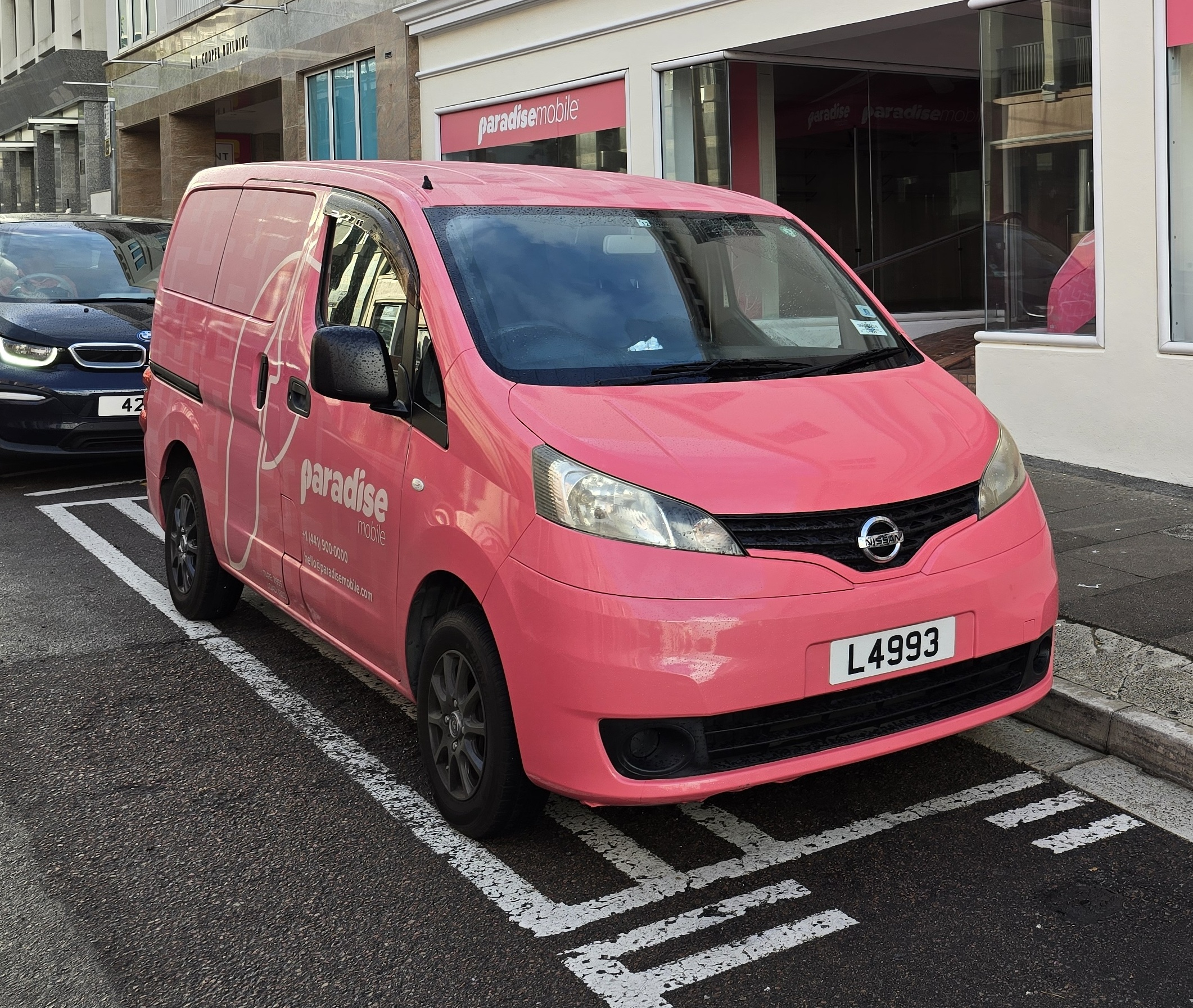
Light Truck Licence Plate In Bermuda NV200

Formats
Image	First issued	Design	Serial format	Serials issued	Notes
		White on black	P 1234		Before 1975, Bermudian number plates were similar to the plates used by US Forces. A preceding 'P' denoted a private vehicle.
A 1234	1975	White on black	A 1234		For US Forces in Bermuda.
		Black on white	12345		
		Black on white	12345		The current format for private vehicles. This format originally started in the mid-4-figures taking over from where the PXXXX series left off. Only one car can be issued to a residence.
AA123					
CL123					Classic cars are designated by a preceding 'CL'. An individual may own several such vehicles with certain restrictions on usage.
L1234					Light trucks are designated by a preceding 'L'. Light trucks (up to 6600 lbs) are registered to legitimate businesses and can be driven on a regular car license.
IN1234					Intermediate trucks are designated by a preceding 'IN'. Intermediate trucks (up to 9000 lbs) are registered to legitimate businesses.
HA123					Heavy A trucks are designated by a preceding 'HA'. There is also HB, HC and HX for larger vehicles.
LP1234					Light Private vehicles are designated by a preceding 'LP'.
T1234					Taxis are designated by a preceding 'T'.
CM123					Construction vehicles are designated by a preceding 'CM' and three numbers.
123Y					Auxiliary cycles are serialised with a trailing letter. Letter rolls over when number reaches 999. Plates are white lettering on a blue background usually with the numerals on a row above the single letter. Rental auxiliary cycles follow the same format but are red letters on a white background.
CA426					Motorcycles are serialised with a preceding pair of letters. Letters roll over when the number reaches 999 thus: AA001>AA999>AB001>AB999....BF001>BF999>BG001 etc.
RMC001					Electric rental cars for tourists.

== See also ==
- Vehicle registration plates of British overseas territories
