= Vehicle registration plates of the Turks and Caicos Islands =

British Overseas of the Turks and Caicos
- Country: Turks and Caicos
- Country code: None

Current series
- Size: 300 mm × 152 mm 11.8 in × 6.0 in
- Serial format: None
- Colour (front): Black on white
- Colour (rear): Black on white

The Turks and Caicos Islands requires its residents to register their motor vehicles and display vehicle registration plates. Current plates are North American standard 6 × 12 inches (152 × 300 mm). Vehicle plates have five digits on them, some with the text 'Beautiful by Nature' and 'Turks and Caicos Islands', others starting with the letters 'TC'.

== Passenger baseplates ==
Image	First issued	Design	Slogan	Serial format	Serials issued	Notes
		Embossed white serial on black plate with white border	none	TC 123		
TC 1234	1978	Embossed red serial on white plate	none	TC 1234; TC12345		Red serials denote private vehicles
	2000	Embossed red serial on white plate; Coat of arms symbols in each corner; slogan embossed at top; "TURKS & CAICOS ISLANDS" embossed at bottom	Beautiful by Nature	12345		
	2004	As above, but with name, slogan and graphics screened instead of embossed	Beautiful by Nature	12345		
	2006	As above, but with "Turks & Caicos Islands" in different font	Beautiful by Nature	12345		
	December 2022	Embossed black serial on white plate; Unique graphic at left; slogan screened at top; "Turks & Caicos Islands" screened at bottom	Beautiful by Nature	12345		Graphic on plates is unique to each island.

== Non-passenger plates ==
Image	First issued	Design	Slogan	Serial format	Serials issued	Notes
TC 1234	1994	Embossed green serial on white plate with green border		TC 1234		commercial (green)
TC 1234						government (black)
TC 1234	1993	Embossed yellow serial on white plate with yellow border; "S D" embossed at top		TC 1234		Self drive (rental cars)
	2006	Embossed red serial on blue, white and green gradient plate; Flamingo graphic in space between characters; Graphical symbols in each corner; "Turks & Caicos Islands" screened at top; "TCI Taxi" screened at bottom		TC 1234		Taxi
						The Governor's cars simply display a plate with a crown.

== See also ==
- Vehicle registration plates of British overseas territories
