= Vehicle registration plates of Anguilla =

British Overseas Territory of Anguilla
- Country: Anguilla
- Country code: None

Current series
- Slogan: None
- Size: 152 mm × 300 mm 6 in × 12 in
- Serial format: A 1234
- Introduced: 2007; 19 years ago

History
- First issued: 1950; 76 years ago

Anguilla requires its residents to register their motor vehicles and display vehicle registration plates. Current plates, changed in 2007, have a blue and white background with black letters and are North American standard 6 by 12 inches (152 mm × 300 mm). Vehicle plates have an 'A' followed by four digits. The letter denoting the type of vehicle has been moved to the front and 'P' is now designated for personal vehicles.

Image	First issued	Design	Slogan	Serial format	Serials issued	Notes
	1950	White on black	None	A 123		
A 1234		White on black	None	A 1234		
A 1234 H		White on black	None	A 1234 H		Hire vehicles / taxis
A 1234 G		White on black	None	A 1234 G		Governmental vehicles
A 1234 R		White on black	None	A 1234 R		Rental vehicles
		Crown emblem on black	None	—N/a		Governor's car
	2007	Black on a blue-and-white gradient with the coat of arms of Anguilla to the left	Rainbow City	A 123		

== See also ==
- Vehicle registration plates of British overseas territories
