= Vehicle registration plates of the British Overseas Territories =

Vehicle registration plates, commonly known as number plates, are the mandatory alphanumeric or numeric plates used to display the registration mark of a vehicle.

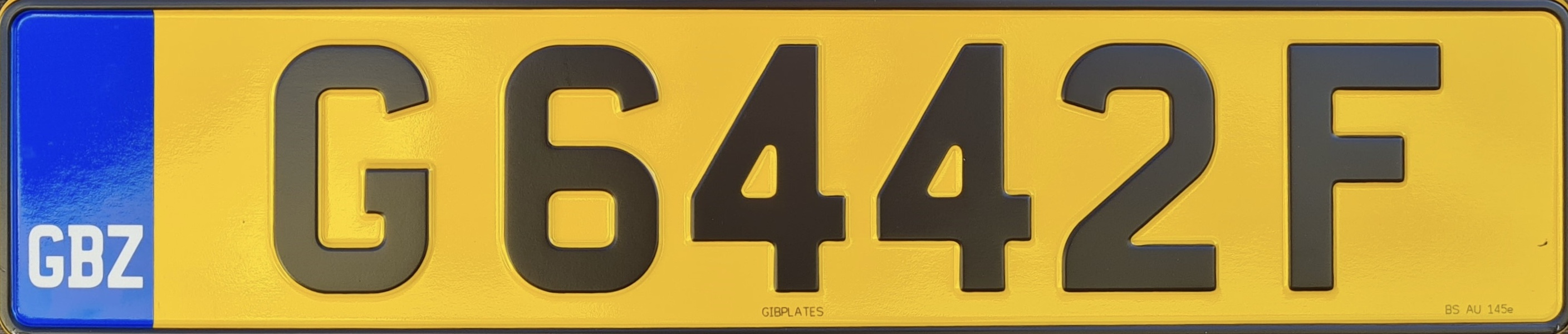
A Gibraltar number plate, featuring the GBZ country identifier

Some of the British overseas territories, including Gibraltar and the Falkland Islands, use number plates similar to those of the UK, with the same colours and typeface. Some former British colonies which adopted British style number plates have continued with those customs, notable examples are Brunei, Cyprus, Guyana, Hong Kong, Kenya, Malaysia, Singapore, Trinidad and Tobago and Tanzania.

== Gibraltar ==
Gibraltar's number plates originally consisted of the letter 'G' and up to five digits. When G 99999 was reached in 2001, a new system was introduced, consisting of 'G' followed by four digits and a serial letter. The territory's international vehicle identifier GBZ is featured on these plates. Military vehicles use the letters 'RN' preceded and followed by two digits, while the Governor's official car displays a silver crown on a black plate.

G 1234 A	G 1234 A
G 1234 A	G 1234 A
G 12345	G 12345
12RN34	12RN34
GG 12345	GG 12345
DLR 1234	DLR 1234

== Falkland Islands ==
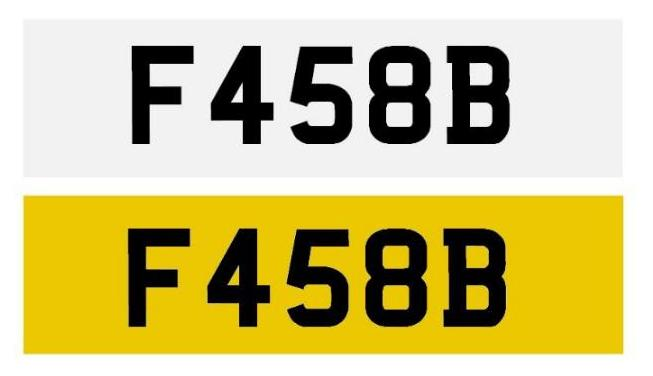
Falkland Islands vehicle registration plate front and rear

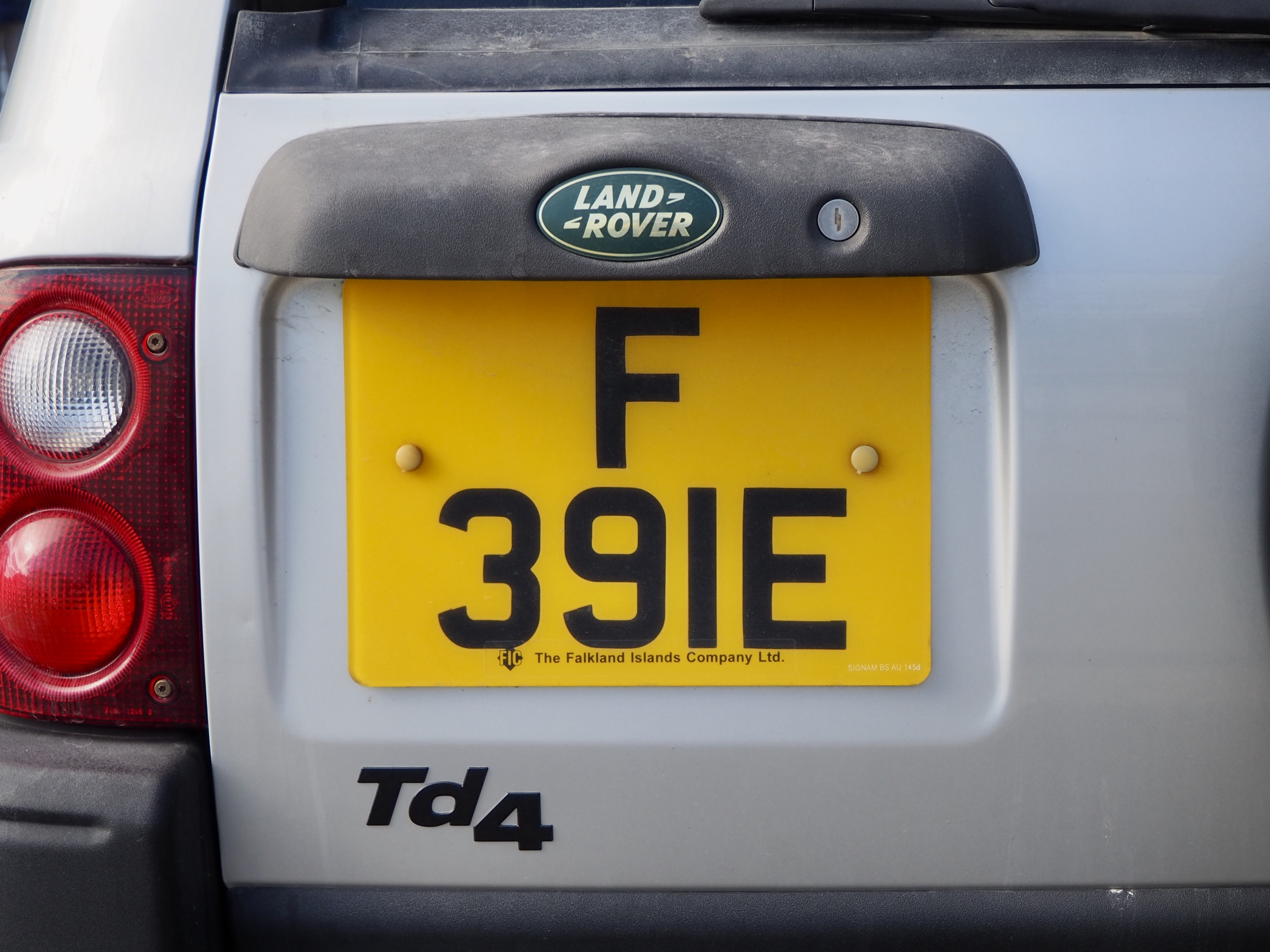
A number plate from the Falkland Islands in the standard private series; F, followed by three serial numbers, and a serial letter.

In the Falkland Islands, the format is 'F' followed by up to three digits and a letter registered in a strict sequence. Plates should be black-on-yellow for the rear of the vehicle and black-on-white for the front of the vehicle although black-on-yellow is not unknown. Government vehicles are registered with 'F' followed by four digits. White on black was previously used.

F 123 A	F 123 A
F 1234	F 1234
F 123	F 123

== Bermuda ==
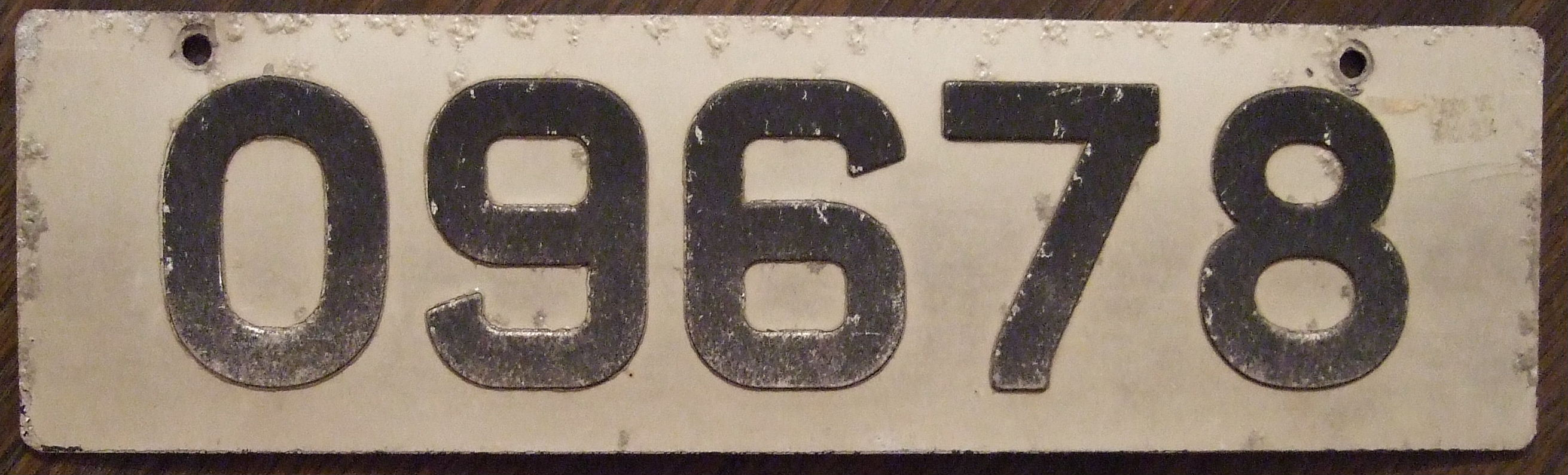
A standard Bermudian number plate

From 1975 Bermuda licence plates issued to general passenger vehicles have five black digits on a plain white background (both front and rear), and have a size similar to UK plates. Non-private vehicles have licence plates with two preceding letters followed by three numbers.

Personalised plates have recently become available that allow motorists to choose any seven letters, overlaid on a map of the island with "Bermuda" printed across the top, on a plate of North American standard 6 × 12 inches (152 × 300 mm). Similar sized plates are used for classic cars, designated by a preceding 'CL'.

US Forces in Bermuda have used black plates with white characters since 1975, a letter followed by four numbers.

Before 1975, Bermudian number plates were similar to the plates used by US Forces. A preceding 'P' denoted a private vehicle; it was followed by four digits and was white-on-black.

12345	12345
AA123	AA123
CL123	CL123
A 1234	A 1234

== Saint Helena, Ascension and Tristan da Cunha ==
=== Saint Helena ===
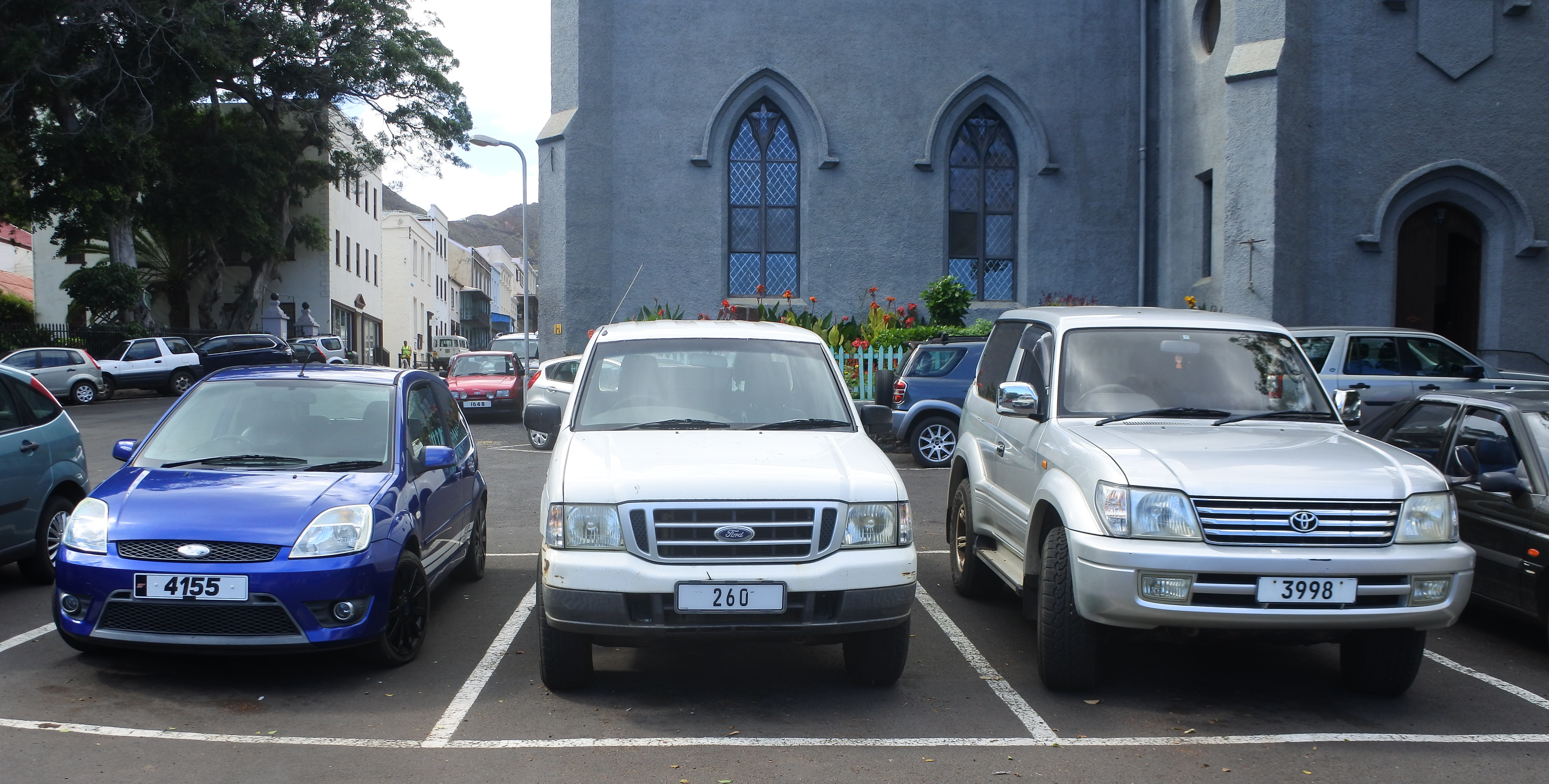
Saint Helena number plates

Saint Helena number plates just have digits on them, with government vehicles having a prefix of 'SHG'. Plates are black-on-white for the front of the vehicle, and black-on-yellow for the rear and use UK dimensions. The Governor's car has a crown on a white plate.

1234	1234
SHG 123	SHG 123

=== Ascension Island ===
Ascension Island plates are similar to those of Saint Helena but start with an 'A'.

A 1234	A 1234

=== Tristan da Cunha ===
Tristan da Cunha number plates have up to three digits following prefix 'T.D.C.' or 'TDC'. Plates are white-on-black and have not changed format since 1969. Black-on-white and black-on-yellow are also seen.

T.D.C. 123	T.D.C. 123
T.D.C. 123	T.D.C. 123
T.D.C. 123	T.D.C. 123

== Anguilla ==
Anguilla has an 'A' followed by four digits, with a 'G' on the end for a government vehicle, a 'H' for a hire vehicle/taxi and an 'R' for a rental vehicle. The Governor's car has a crown on a black plate.

Plates were changed in 2007. They are now North American standard sized and have a blue and white background with black letters. The Anguillan shield-of-arms is shown next to the number with 'Anguilla' and 'Rainbow City' above and below the plate respectively. The letter denoting the type of vehicle has been moved to the front and 'P' is now shown for personal vehicles.

A 1234	A 1234
A 1234 H	A 1234 H
A 1234 G	A 1234 G
A 1234 R	A 1234 R

== British Virgin Islands ==
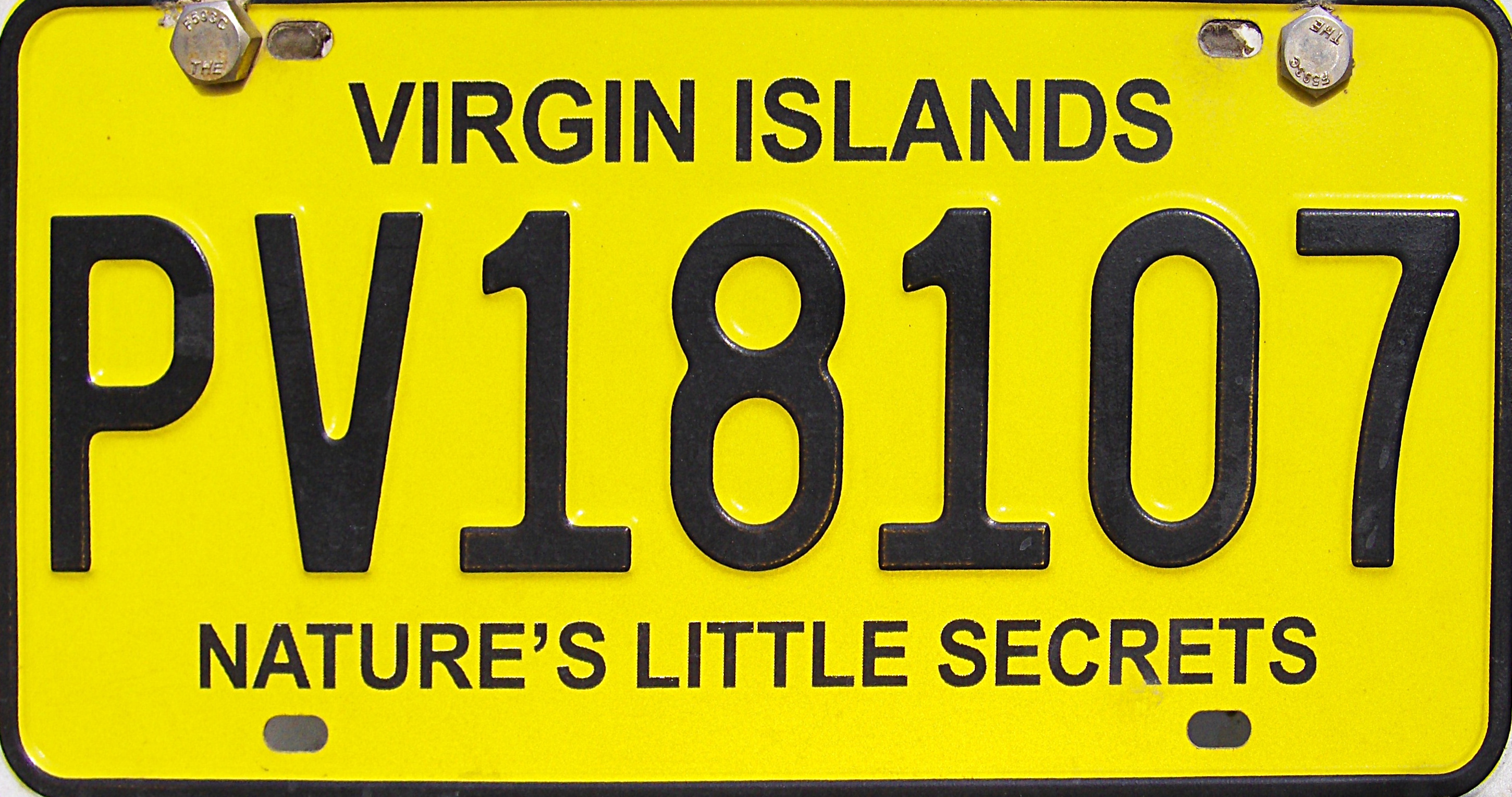
New style number plate used in the Virgin Islands

In the British Virgin Islands private vehicles have 'PV' followed by four digits, 'VI' was used as the prefix for one year 1995–96; before 1995 only numbers were used. Commercial vehicles have 'CM' followed by four digits; rental vehicles have 'RT', and taxis have 'TX'. Government vehicles have 'GV' followed by four digits and have white letters on red. Many plates have 'Virgin Islands' and 'Nature's Little Secret' above and below the plates respectively. Before 1996, British standard sizes were used, but this has since converted to a size more familiar in the US Virgin Islands.

PV 12345	PV 12345
TX 12345	TX 12345
RT 12345	RT 12345
CM 1234	CM 1234
GV 1234	GV 1234
VI 1234	VI 1234
12345	12345

== Cayman Islands ==
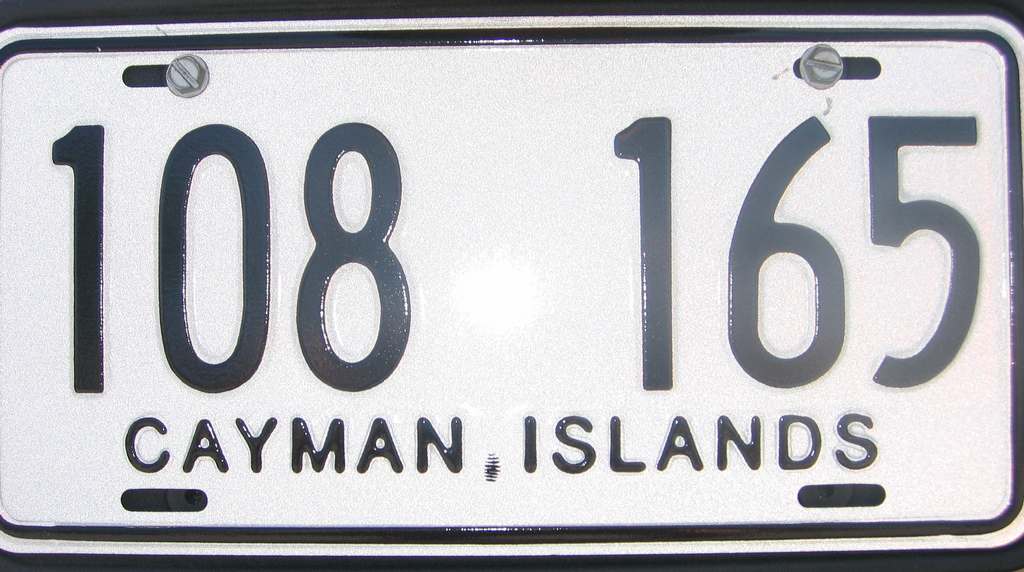
Cayman Islands plate on a hired motorbike

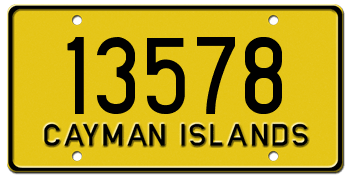

Cayman Islands number plates usually have six numbers on them, separated into groups of three. Most plates have 'Cayman Islands' written beneath the numbers and are North American standard 6 × 12 inches (152 × 300 mm). Front and rear are both black-on-yellow for private cars, black-on-white for hire cars, red-on-yellow for disabled drivers, red-on-white for taxis, and black-on-orange for HGVs and trailers. The Governor's car has a crown on the front only.

In 2003, quincentennial plates (known as Q-plates) were issued; they had four blue numbers following a 'Q' on a background depicting a picturesque Cayman scene with celebratory logos. Initially, Q-plates were issued with white characters but these were recalled and replaced.

123 456	123 456
123 456	123 456
123 456	123 456
123 456	123 456
123 456	123 456
CI 1234	CI 1234

== Turks and Caicos Islands ==
Turks and Caicos Islands plates have five digits on them, sometimes with the text 'Beautiful by Nature' and 'Turks and Caicos Islands', other times starting with the letters 'TC'.

Different colours are used for private (red), commercial (green), government (black) and hire (yellow) cars. The Governor's cars do not display a number plate, simply a plate with a crown.

TC 1234	TC 1234
TC 1234	TC 1234
TC 1234	TC 1234
TC 1234	TC 1234

== Montserrat ==
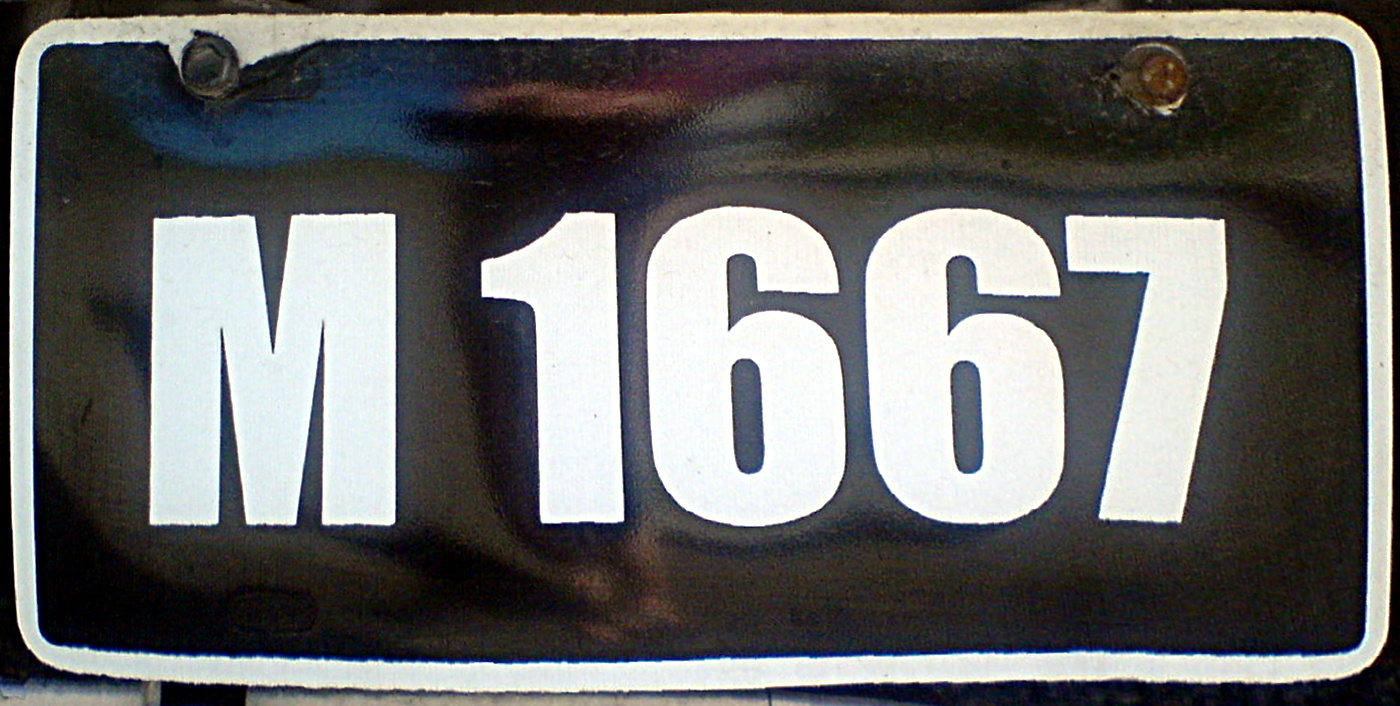
Montserrat vehicle registration plate

Montserrat plates start with a letter indicating the type of car ('R' for rental, 'M' for private, etc.), followed by up to four numbers. The background colour can vary but the letters and numbers are always in white.

M 1234	M 1234
R 1234	R 1234
H 1234	H 1234

== Akrotiri and Dhekelia ==
2014 style number plate for Akrotiri and Dhekelia

The style mirrors that of Cyprus, the colour of the rear plate changing from yellow to white in 2013. The typeface used also changed to FE-Schrift, to be in line with Cyprus. Unlike Cyprus, the date of first registration is not shown.

SBAA 12	SBAA 12
SBAA 12	SBAA 12

== See also ==
- Vehicle registration plate
- Vehicle registration plates of the United Kingdom
