= Vehicle registration plates of Guyana =

Guyana
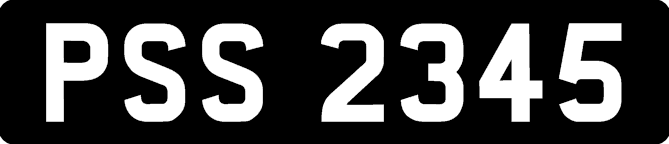
- Current regular legal standard number plate from Guyana.
- Country: Guyana
- Country code: GUY

Current series
- Serial format: Not standard
- Colour (front): White on black
- Colour (rear): White on black

The design for vehicle registration plates of Guyana consist of simple white lettering on a black plate. The format is 2 or 3 letters followed by 4 numbers. The 4 numbers are between 1 and 9999 with no leading zero.

== Letter arrangement ==
The first letter is the vehicle type and are as follows:

- P- Private
- H- Hire/ Taxi
- B- Bus (or vehicles used for public transportation)
- G- Goods (powered Trade vehicles)
- C- Cycle
- T-Trailer (Non-powered trade vehicles)
- DPL, DC- Diplomat
- DFB- Guyana Defence Force
- CRG/GUY- Official vehicle from the State pool (typically used for transporting visiting VIPs)

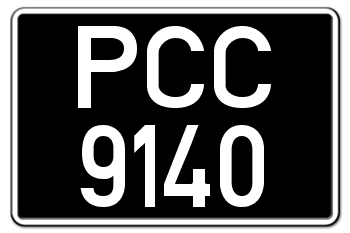
Private Car registration

Specifically, "The letters and figures on the identification mark must be indelibly inscribed in white upon a black surface and no letter or figure shall be capable of being detached from such surface. Additionally, all letters and figures must be three and a half inches high; every part of each letter and figure must be five-eighth of an inch broad and the total width of the space taken by every letter or figure must be two and a half inches."

Diplomatic plates have black lettering on a yellow plate and dealer plates have red lettering on a white plate.

The series is indicated by the following one or two letters and it indicates the time at which the vehicle was registered. Some letters may be left out to avoid confusion with others e.g. I and Q are skipped. The very first series consisted of a single letter. The second series consisted of two letters (between 1933 and 1970) from PA 1 to PZ 9999. The current series uses three letters where the second letter is repeated. The first registered number in this series would therefore be PAA 1, and after PAA 9999, PBB 1 and so on.

The SS series was issued in 2013, TT in 2014, VV in 2015. WW began in early 2017, XX in 2018 In 2019, the Guyana Revenue Authority considered issuing custom plates in anticipation of completion of the PZZ series.

Upon completion of the PZZ series, it was announced that the next series will be PAB 1 to 9999, then PAC 1 to 9999, PAD 1 to 9999 and so on. It is presumed that on completion of the PAZ series, the next series will be PBA, with PBB and all other repeating letter combinations being skipped since they are already in use. This is similar to the system currently in use in Trinidad and Tobago.

As of September 2026, the current series for Private vehicles is PAS

== Official Plates ==
=== President ===
Presidential plate

The vehicle plate of the President of Guyana has always been a gold Cacique's Crown on a black background. This plate is only reserved for and used on the vehicle which physically carries the President. As such the plate may be moved from one type of vehicle to another, depending on which one the President is using.

=== Prime minister ===
Prime Minister's plate

The vehicle carrying the Prime Minister of Guyana has been seen using a plate containing the Coat-of-Arms of Guyana in gold colour on a black background.
