= Vehicle registration plates of Kenya =

Republic of Kenya
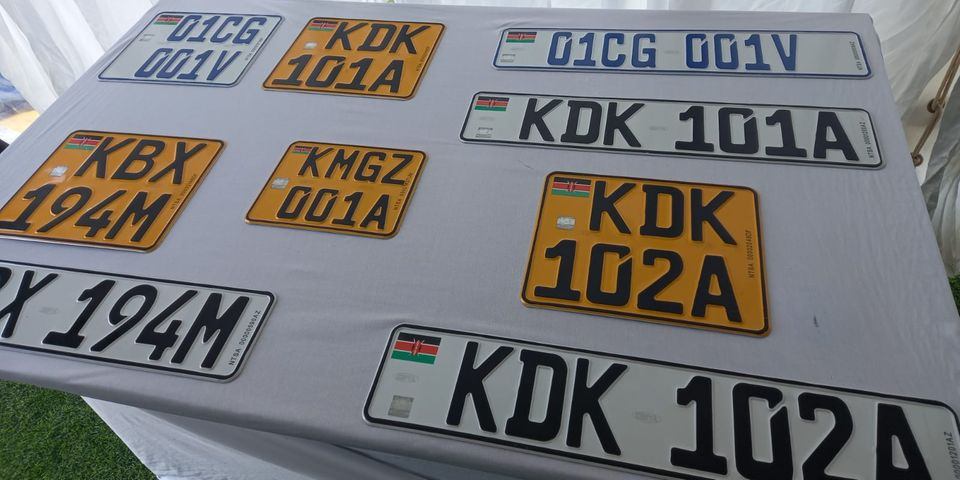
- (New) Kenyan regular legal standard number plates.
- Country: Kenya
- Country code: EAK

Current series
- Size: Rectangular -520 mm × 110 mm; Square - 250 mm × 200 mm
- Serial format: Not standard
- Colour (front): Black on White
- Colour (rear): Black on Yellow

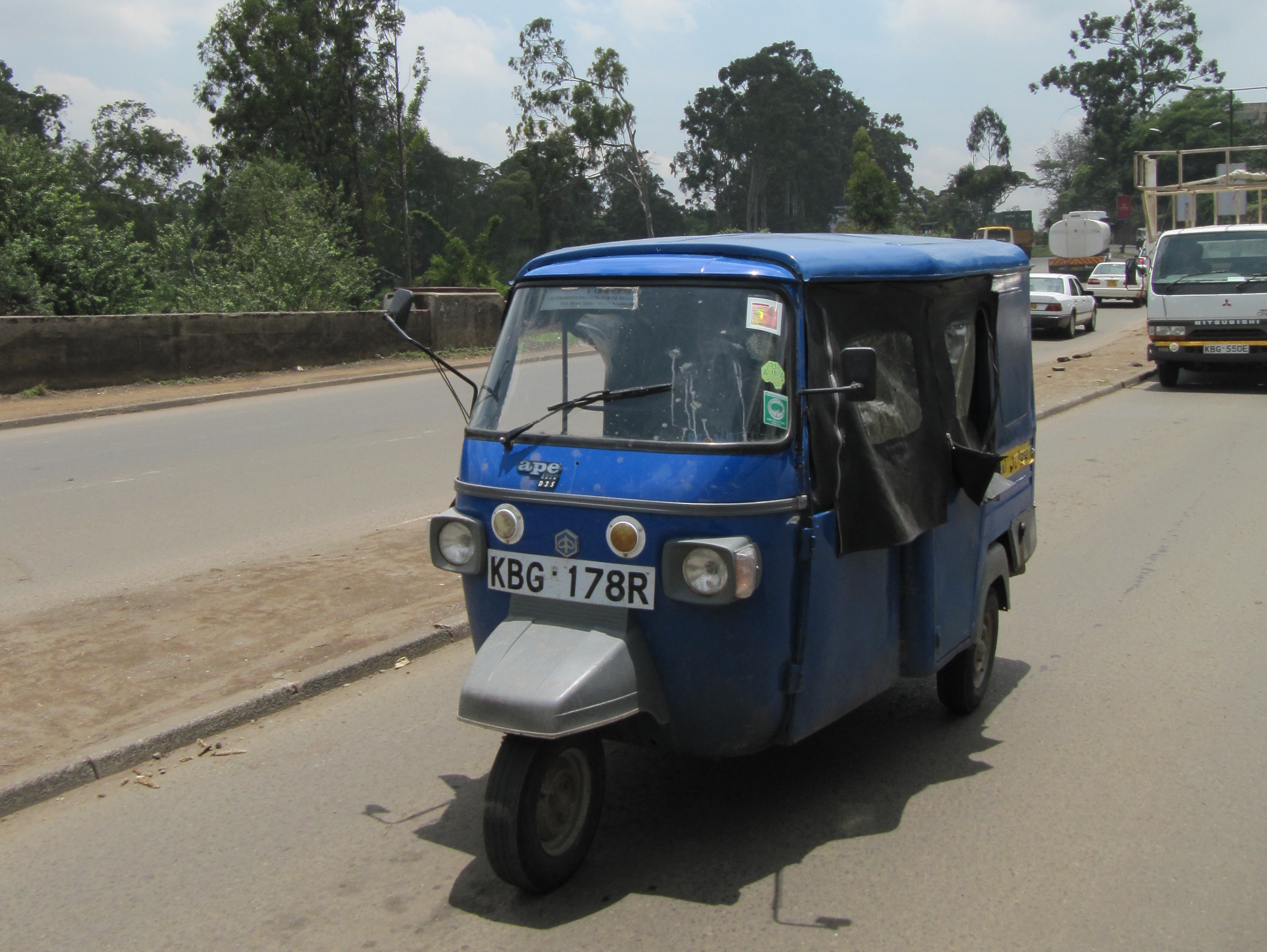
An auto rickshaw with the current Kenyan licence plate in Nairobi

The current series of vehicle registration plates in Kenya are on a white plate with black lettering and look quite similar to UK suffix style registrations. The format is LLL NNNL, where ‘L’ denotes a letter and ‘N’ denotes a digit. The older series of number plates were black with white or silver lettering. Later in the older series the front plates were reflective white with black lettering and the rear plates were reflective yellow with black lettering. According to Kenya National Bureau of Statistics there are over 1,626,380 vehicles on Kenyan roads as of 2011.

== 1920-1989 ==
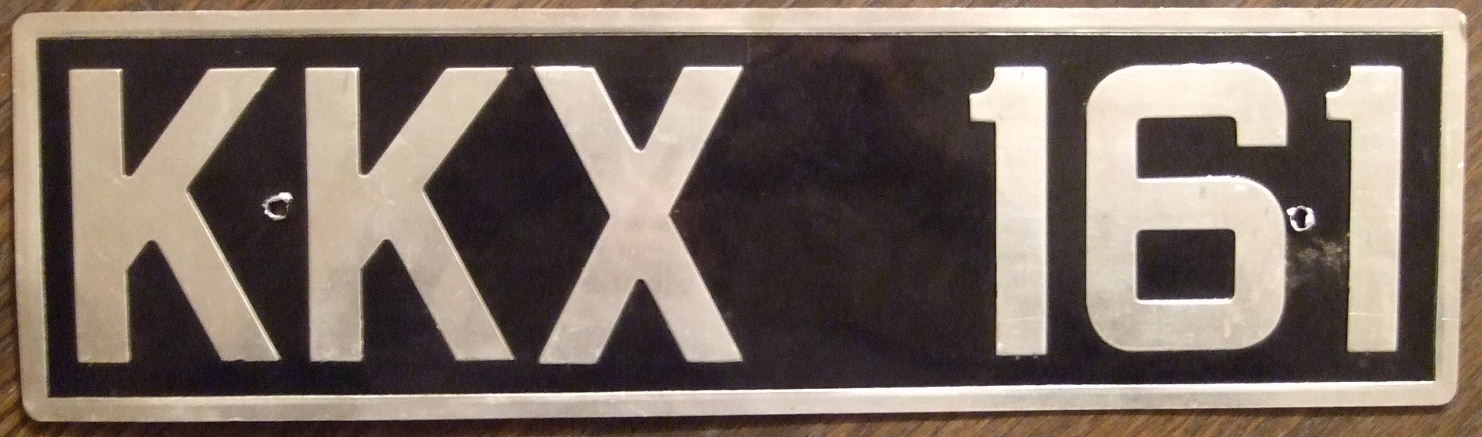
A 1950–1989 series Kenyan (K) Nairobi (K) license plate from October (X) 1967

It is not known when the first vehicle was registered in Kenya, but it is thought to be before 1920. Single letters were attributed to each of the 14 registration districts i.e. N=Kiambu, E=Kisumu, J=Kitale, B, H, T, W=Nairobi, A=Mombasa, C=Nakuru, D=Kericho, F=Eldoret, G=Nyeri, K=Muranga (Fort Hall), L=Kisii, Q=Machakos, S=Lamu, V=Isiolo, Y=Nanyuki. A serial number of 1-999 followed, on white on black plates, save for public transport vehicles, i.e. buses, taxis and hire cars, which used black on white.

The 1950 K-prefix series was a change to a three-letter numbering system, necessitated by the increasing number of vehicles being registered. It was introduced on a regional basis; All plates began with K, followed by the regional code (below) and a serial letter A-Z, not using letters I or O.

- Nairobi - KB (1950), KF (1955), KG (1959), KH (1961), KK (1965), KM (1968), KN (1970), KP (1972), KQ (1974), KR (1976) and KV (1978)
- Mombasa - KA (1950), KJ (1966), KT (1977)
- Nakuru - KC (1950), KL (1967), KS (1977)
- Kisumu - KD (1950), KU (1977)
- Nanyuki - KE

Some anomalies were issued;

- Some KC and KL numbers were issued to Eldoret and Kitale.
- KBA was issued to Nyeri, the first Nairobi number being KBB. Nyeri then followed with KFE and KGT.
- Kericho was issued with KDB then KDK which were used up to 1969.
- Kisii was issued with KDE then shared KDK with Kericho.
- Kakamega used KDL between 1962 and 1967.

The numbering system was centralised in 1980 and after that date all Kenya numbers are in sequence. Between 1980 and 1984 the unused numbers from Nakuru (KS), Mombasa (KT) and Kisumu (KU) were issued, KW (1984) being the first number that was never used regionally.

== 1989-2007 ==
After the registration of vehicle KZZ 999, the second generation was started in 1989. The series follow KAA 001A to KAZ 999Z The present KAA xxx A series had, the advantage being that each third letter of the number provided for 23,976 registrations instead of the previous 999. Hence for the series to be finished about 575424 vehicle will be registered. KAF, KAO, KAI were omitted.

== 2007-2014 ==
After the registration of vehicle KAZ 999Z, the third generation was started in mid 2007 as KBA 001A. The series ran from KBA 001A to KBZ 999Z

In 2014, the government announced a revamp of the registration plates to a new look, featuring electronic chips

== 2014-2020 ==
After the registration of vehicle KBZ 999Z, the fourth generation was started in 2014 as KCA 001A. The series ran from KCA 001A to KCZ 999Z.

== 2020-2026 ==
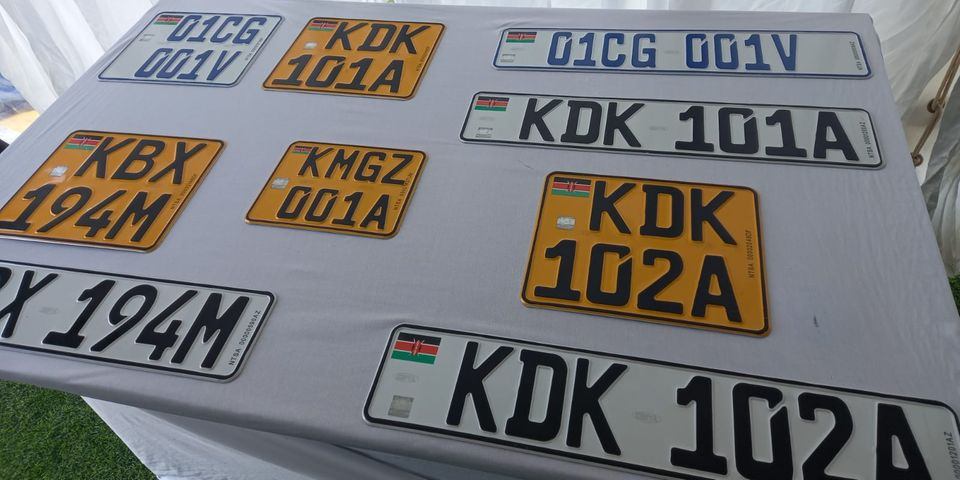
New Kenyan license plates launched in August 2022

After the registration of vehicle KCZ 999Z, the fifth generation was started in early 2020 with KDA 001A. The series will run from KDA 001A to KDZ 999Z.

A new look of the Vehicle registration Plates was launched in August 2022. These new plates incorporate microchip technology, various anti-counterfeit features and a FE-Schrift font. The plates also include an imprinted Kenyan Flag, a hologram, watermark and a serial number linked to the vehicle chassis number.

In March 2024, the government of Kenya unveiled a new series of license plates that will be used by owners of electric vehicles and electric motorcycles. These place will have a white font on a green background. The reason behind this is to help in identifying electric vehicles and motorcycles. This is an effort by the Kenyan government to promote green economy in the transport industry. The new license plates will start from EVA 001A for electric vehicles and EMAA 001A for electric motorcycles.

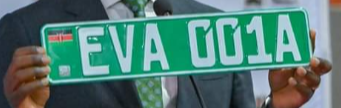
A sample of the license plates for electric vehicles in Kenya.

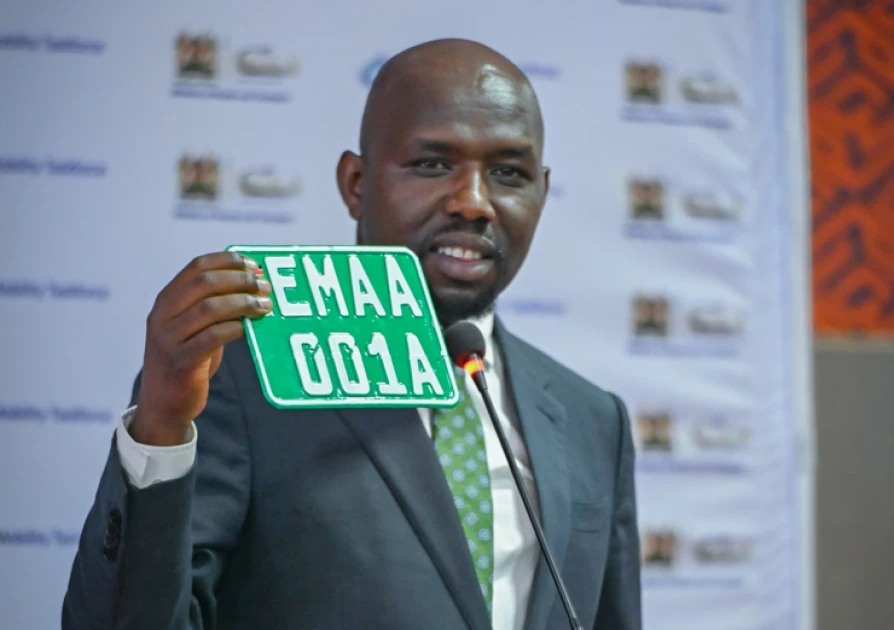
Roads and Transport CS Kipchumba Murkomen holds a green number plate during the launch at KICC on March 27, 2024. PHOTO | COURTESY

== 2026-Present ==
KE Series were announced in August 2026 after the KD series registrations ended.

== Other Plates ==
- Motorcycles now use KMCA series;
- Heavy Machinery uses "KHMA" series;
- Tricycle uses KTWC series.
- NGO - KX; The Plates are red with white letters and numbers
- Vehicle Dealers Number plate series - KD, while assemblers and fabricators use KG. The plates have green background with white letters.

== Governmental Plates ==
There are other number sequences that are used in Kenya.

- The Kenyan Government uses GK;
- The Kenyan County Governments use CG, for example Nairobi County vehicles are 47 CG;
- Governors use GVN followed by their county code;
- The Speaker of National Assembly uses SNA;
- The Speaker of the Senate uses SS;
- The Chief Justice uses CJ;
- Kenya Army - KA;
- Kenya Air Force - KAF;
- Kenya Navy - KN;
- Kenya Agricultural Institute - KAI;
- Parastatals use blue plates with white letters and numbers

== Diplomatic and United Nations codes ==
The diplomatic number given to the embassies were assigned in the order that they recognized Kenya's independence, with Germany (then West Germany) as the first country to recognize Kenya's independence having the diplomatic plate 1 CD. They are Red number plates front and back with white letters and numbers.

As of August 2025, the diplomatic / UN sequence assignation was as below:

1 CD - Germany (e.g., sequence 1CD1AK, 1CD2AK...1CD999AK,... 1CD01BK)

2 CD - Russian Federation

3 CD - Ethiopia

4 CD - China

5 CD - Norway

6 CD - Hungary

7 CD - Egypt

8 CD - Serbia

9 CD - Italy

10 CD - France

11 CD - Slovakia

12 CD - Denmark

13 CD - Japan

14 CD - Sudan

15 CD - Austria

16 CD - India

17 CD - Australia

18 CD - Canada

19 CD - Holy See (The Vatican)

20 CD - Finland

21 CD - Switzerland

22 CD - Britain

23 CD - Liberia

24 CD - Israel

25 CD - Nigeria

26 CD - Ghana

27 CD - Netherlands

28 CD - Malawi

29 CD - USA

30 CD - Belgium

31 CD - Sweden

32 CD - Pakistan

33 CD - Poland

34 CD - Korea

35 CD - Bulgaria

36 CD - Greece

37 CD - Cuba

38 CD - Kuwait

39 CD - Spain

40 UN - United Nations Development Programme (UNDP)

41 UN - World Health Organization (WHO)

42 UN - United Nations Educational, Scientific and Cultural Organization (UNESCO)

43 UN - International Bank for Reconstruction and Development (The World Bank)

44 UN - Food and Agriculture Organization of the United Nations (FAO)

45 UN - World Food Programme (WFP)

45 CD - Romania

46 CD - Thailand

47 CD - The African Union and its missions

48 CD - Colombia

49 CD - India

50 CD - Somalia

51 CD - Brazil

52 CD - Turkey

53 CD - Lesotho

54 CD - Zambia

55 CD - Madagascar

56 CD - Malaysia

57 CD - D.R. Congo (DRC)

58 CD - Swaziland

59 CD - Sri Lanka

60 CD - Iraq

61 CD - Rwanda

62 UN - United Nations High Commissioner for Refugees/UN Refugee Agency (UNHCR)

63 UN - United Nations Children's Fund (UNICEF)

64 CD - Iran

65 CD - Cyprus

66 CD - Argentina

67 UN - United Nations Information Centre (UNIC)

68 CD - Philippines

69 CD - Burundi

70 CD - Chile

71 CD - Oman

72 CD - League of Arab States/Arab League

73 CD - European Union

74 CD - Yemen

75 CD - Kenya Mission to UNEP

76 CD - Côte d'Ivoire (Consulate)

77 CD - Bangladesh

78 CD - Saudi Arabia

79 UN - United Nations Centre for Human Settlements/UN-Habitat (UNCHS)

80 CD - Libya

81 CD - Ireland (Consulate)

82 UN - United Nations Centre for Human Settlements/UN-Habitat (Kenya Mission)

83 CD - Algeria

84 CD - Palestine

85 CD - Uganda

86 CD - Mexico

87 CD - Morocco

88 CD - Costa Rica (Consulate)

89 CD - Gabon (Consulate)

90 UN - UNICEF Kenya Mission

91 CD - Indonesia

92 CD - Portugal

93 CD - Venezuela

94 CD - Zimbabwe

95 UN - International Civil Aviation Organization (ICAO)

96 CD - Asian Development Bank

97 CD - Tanzania

99 CD - Peru

100 UN - International Finance Corporation (IFC)

101 UN - United Nations Environment Programme (UNEP) Norwegian Mission

102 CD - Mozambique

103 CD - South Africa

104 CD - Eritrea

105 UN - United Nations Office at Nairobi (UNON)

106 UN - International Organization for Migration (IOM)

106 CD - Czech Republic

107 CD - International Monetary Fund (IMF)

108 UN - United Nations Population Fund (UNFPA)

110 CD - Botswana High Commission

110 UN - United Nations Industrial Development Organization (UNIDO)

111 UN - United Nations Programme on HIV/AIDS (UNAIDS)

112 UN - International Fund for Agricultural Development (IFAD)

113 UN - United Nations Office for Project Services (UNOPS)

114 UN - United Nations Resident Coordinator (UNRCO)

115 UN - United Nations Office on Drugs and Crime Regional Office for Eastern Africa (UNODC Roea)

116 UN - United Nations Office for the Coordination of Humanitarian Affairs (OCHA)

117 UN - UN WOMEN

118 UN - United Nations Support Office in Somalia (UNSOS)

119 UN - United Nations Offices of High Commissioner for Human Rights (OHCHR)

115 CD - Ukraine

116 CD - Sahrawi

117 CD - Djibouti

118 CD - Sierra Leone

119 CD - Order of Malta

120 CD - Congo-Brazzaville (Republic of The Congo)

121 CD - South Sudan

122 CD - International Criminal Court (ICC)

123 CD - United Arab Emirates (UAE)

124 CD - QATAR

125 CD - SENEGAL

126 CD - ANGOLA

127 CD - Africa Development Bank (AFDB)

128 CD - Jordan Embassy

129 CD - Burkina Faso

130 CD - Tunisia Embassy

131 CD - Belarus Embassy

132 CD - Palestine Embassy

133 CD - Cameroon Consulate

134 CD - Barbados

135 CD - Azerbaijan

136 CD - The Intergovernmental Authority on Development (IGAD)

137 CD - Kazakhstan

UNEP - United Nations Environment Programme (UNEP)
