= Vehicle registration plates of Trinidad and Tobago =

Vehicle registration plates in Trinidad and Tobago are categorised using prefixes based on the type of vehicle and feature up to four succeeding digits. Registration plates in Trinidad and Tobago are supposed to be either white figures on a black background or black figures on a white background. All motor vehicles that are operating in the roads of Trinidad and Tobago are required by law to have a registration plate affixed to the front and rear of the vehicle at all times except during very specific situations. This current system has been present for over 40 years.

== Prefix ==
Each registration number begins with a letter designating the class of vehicle.

Prefix:	Type of Vehicle
P- e.g.: PCB 762	Private Vehicle (non commercial)
D- e.g.: D 011	Demonstration vehicle (given to licensed Vehicle Dealer only). Typically used after importing a vehicle and this gives dealer or porter permission to drive said vehicle on public roads, provided that the vehicle is insured and documentation for said vehicle is present e.g. Bill of Lading.
R- e.g.: RDB 1234	Rental Vehicle
H- e.g.: HCY 185	Hired vehicle, bus, taxi, maxi taxi.
V- e.g.: V 122	Visitors (Rare)
X- e.g.: XCN 2231	Terrestrial vehicles e.g. Pavers, Cranes and Excavators
T- e.g.: TCD 9833	Transportation (goods) vehicles, Pickup trucks, lorries, and heavy duty trucks.

Plates for each type are issued in alphabetical order, with the letters CG, DF, I, Q, and V excluded so as to avoid conflict with 1, O and diplomatic including the military and coast guard initials.

== Special plates ==
=== Dignitaries ===
Trinidad & Tobago President's Seal (Coat of Arms)

- The President's official state car usually has the gold Trinidad and Tobago Coat of Arms instead of where a registration plate usually is.
- The Prime Minister's official state car traditionally bears the registration PM 1, PCM1 or as of most recent, PDM 1

=== Military vehicles ===
As a guide, military vehicles' registration plates include the battalion numeral (1-5) then the service initials then followed by a number (up to three digits). The military is allowed by law to control their own registration plates and can decommission a vehicle or appoint any combination registration figures that they so desire.

- The Trinidad and Tobago Regiment's vehicles displays registration plates with the letters TTR. E.g. 1 TTR 3
- The Trinidad and Tobago Defence Force#Coast Guard's vehicles displays registration plates with the letters TTCG . E.g. 1 TTCG 2
- The Trinidad and Tobago Defence Force#Defence Force Reserves' vehicles displays registration plates with the letters VDF. E.g. 1 VDF 25
- The Trinidad and Tobago Defence Force#Air Guard's vehicles displays a registration plates starting with a numeral then TTAG. E.g. 1 TTAG 133
- The Trinidad and Tobago Defence Force's vehicles (Which comprises all four above military forces) displays registration plates with the letters TTDF. E.g., 1 TTDF 4

== Series of figures ==
All examples shall be for private vehicles as they comprise the majority of vehicles used in Trinidad and Tobago, however the same goes for all different classes.

=== 1 - 9999 ===
Registration numbers are issued with a prefix of letter "series", followed by the assigned numbers from 1 - 9999. When the number 9999 has been issued, the Licensing Authority then starts a new letter (usually in alphabetical order with few exceptions, see above) "series" beginning from 1. The first private registered vehicle displayed the registration mark P 1 then moves on to P 2, then P 3, and so forth until P 9999. Depending on the classification of the vehicle, the leading letter (See above table for prefix and classification legend) would reflect its use. By law in Trinidad and Tobago, it is illegal to use a vehicle contrary to its registered purpose. The first set of goods/commercial vehicle. would be formatted as: eg T 4, T 5, etc. and so forth until T 9999. The first public transportation vehicles (taxis) would be formatted as eg. H 6, H 7, and so forth until H 9999.

=== A 1- Z 9999 ===
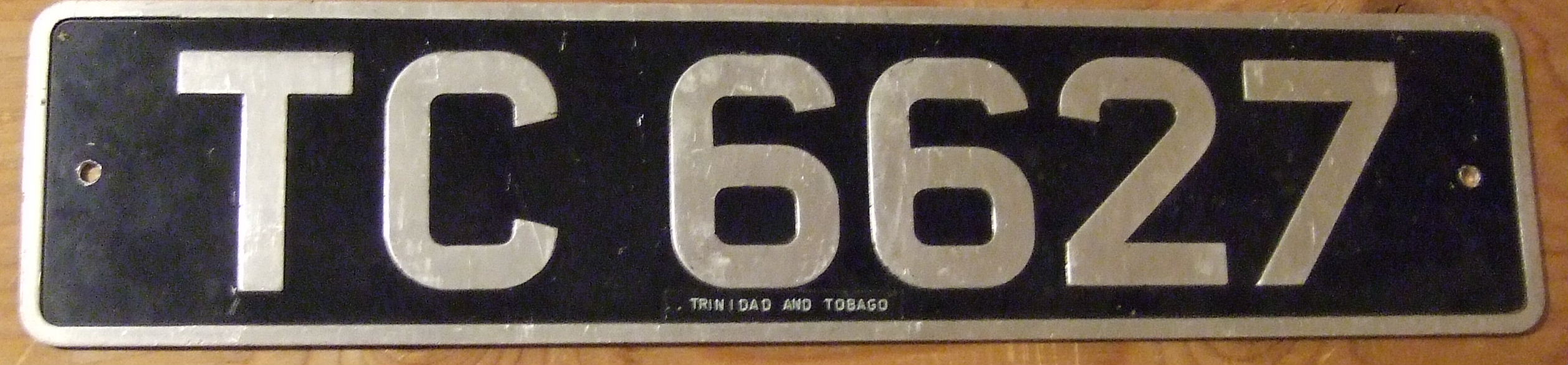
New series commercial plate

Upon the exhaustion of the first batch of registration numbers (i.e. P1-P9999) P 9999, a new "series" was issued; with first Series Classifier then another letter which was A (Private vehicles would be PA 1, PA 2 then PA 3 etc. - PA 9999) . For a commercial vehicle TA. It started at PA 1 and ended at PA 9999. At the end of the end of that series, a new "series" was issued being PB. And so it continued.

=== AA 1- AZ 9999 ===
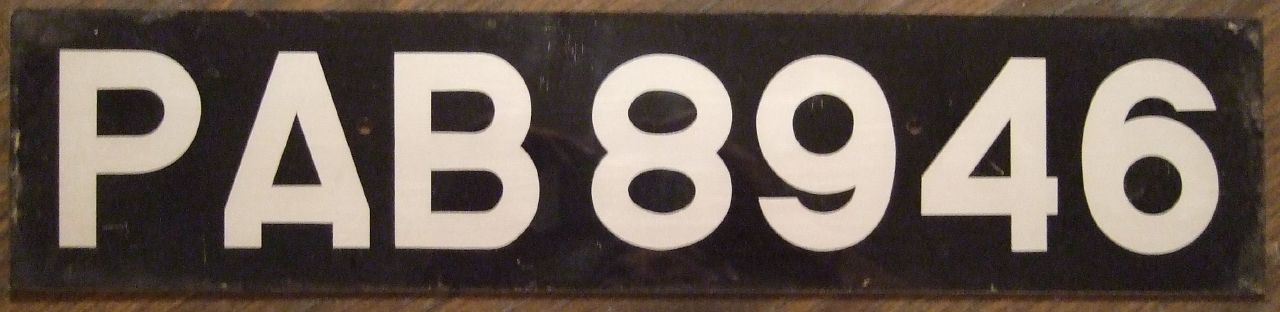
"A" series passenger plate

Upon the exhaustion of Registration number (PZ 1- 9999), The authority then added another letter and began PAA, or TAA for a commercial vehicle, and HAA for a taxi. The first registration number in that "series" being PAA 1, and the last PAA 9999. The following "series" followed suit; PAB; PAC; PAD etc.

=== BA 1 - BZ 9999 ===
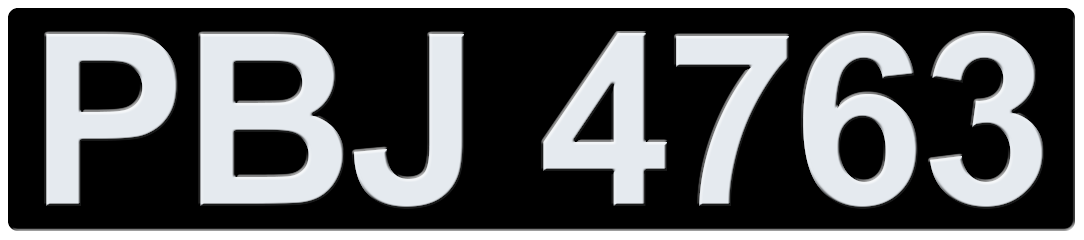
"B" series passenger plate

Upon the issuance of the last in the PAZ "series" i.e. PAZ 9999 the new "series" began as PBA' followed by PBB, PBC, PBD etc.

=== CA 1 - CZ 9999 ===
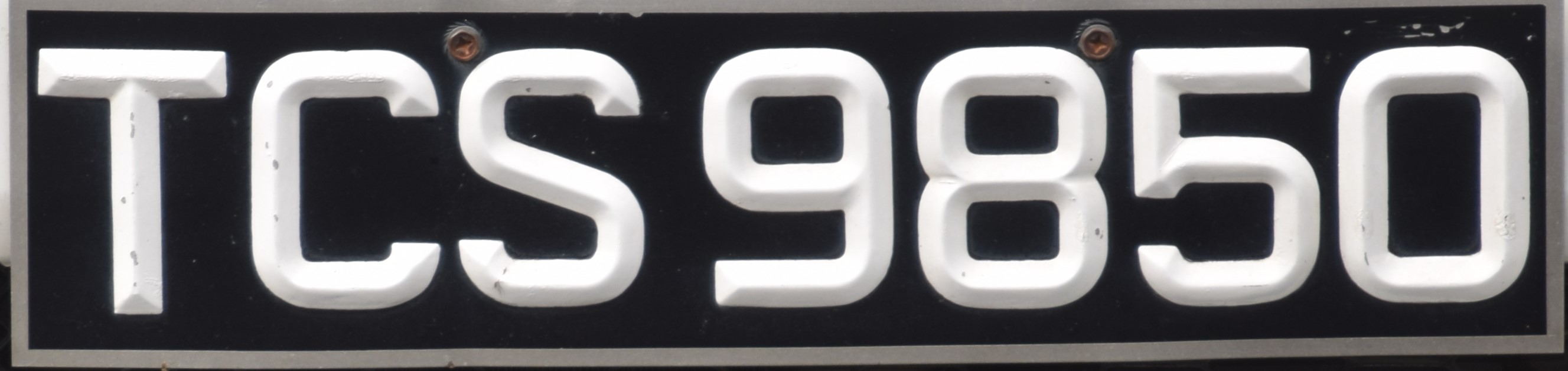
"C" series commercial plate

At the end of the PBZ "series", the new "series" began PCA, followed by PCB, PCC, PCD etc. With the noted exception of PCG and PCO, as this would have caused two main concerns, the first being the similarity to the Coast Guard's registration plate of TTCG when issued for a goods vehicle (TCG), and the second being the similarity to the previously issued PCC "series". The final series for the "C" generation of series commenced in May 2013.

=== DA 1 - DZ 9999 ===
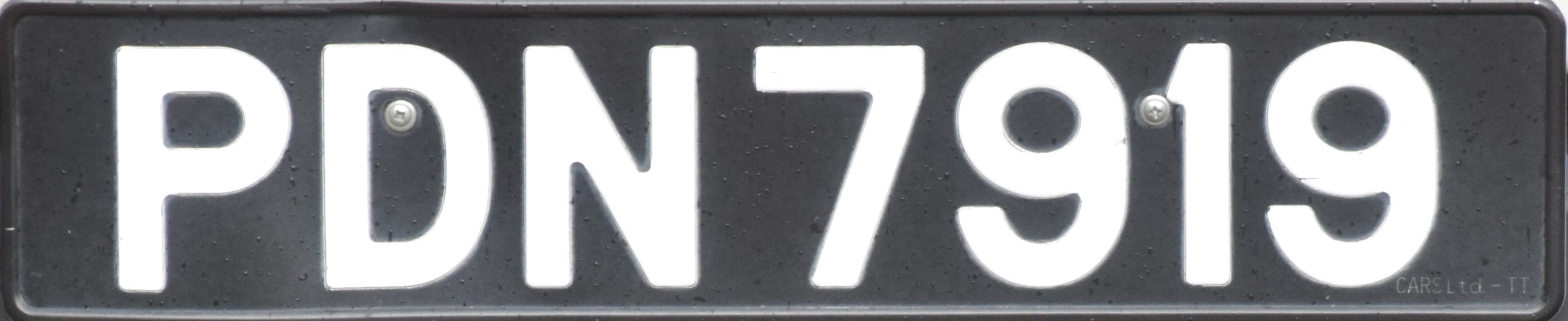
"D" series passenger plate

Upon the issuance of PCZ 9999 the first series for the "D" generation commenced in the final quarter of 2013. The DF series was omitted due to similarities to the defence force registration number when issued to a goods vehicle (TDF). The DO series was also omitted due to being visually similar to DD.

=== Current Registration Series ===
The current series which became effective in 2026 is "EM": Example PEM 1990, HEM 877, TEM 23, REM 9, etc.

=== Reserving registration plates ===
Usually numbers can be reserved, which is done by writing the Transport Commissioner indicating reasons. Aside from this, it is a trend to get numbers with three zeros at the end E.g. 1000, 2000, 3000. or recurrent numbers such as 1111, 9999, 8888 etc. simply for aesthetic purposes. Others may seek to reserve important dates such as birthdates or anniversaries e.g. 1995 or 1234. Generally however, persons do not reserve numbers. The ordinary process of acquiring a number is taking a number from a dispenser and waiting for the number to be called to register the vehicle.

=== Exceptions ===
The Licensing Authority is legally obligated to omit registration numbers as they see fit, with accordance to the Motor Vehicles and Road Traffic Act 48:50. There are many reasons why the Authority may choose to omit a series, however it is mainly done to prevent confusion and ambiguity when visually identifying a motor vehicle.

==== Noted exceptions ====
The Licensing Authority does not issue series ending with: I, V, O, and Q. This is done to prevent confusion with Roman numerals and also to prevent confusion between the numeral 1 and the letter I.

The Licensing Authority also does not issue placeholders or positional notation in series' numbers. That is, an issued number of PCA 1 would not be the same as PCA 0001. While 0001 and 1 may mean the same thing in mathematics, the Licensing Authority views the two numbers as different. To avoid possible confusion, registration numbers do not start with zeros in Trinidad and Tobago.

=== Duplication ===
With this present system duplication is very possible and it has happened a number of times before. However, as the Licensing Authority is made aware of it, they would immediately decommission that number and issue new numbers to the offended parties. It is also worth knowing that there cannot be a E.g. PDA 1 and a TDA 1 since this is considered a duplication. All registration plates are supposed to be unique and the plate series' are in Alphabetical and Numerical order so it depends on not the prefix (i.e. T, P, H, etc.) but the figures that follow it.

=== Appearance ===
The Motor Vehicle Act of Trinidad & Tobago specifies the use of either "white letters and numbers on a black surface" or alternatively, "the letters and numbers shall be black on a white surface." In both instances the regulations states that "every letter or figure shall be indelibly inscribed or so attached to such surface that it cannot readily be detached therefrom" . The Licensing Authority is only responsible for issuing the registration number, it is the duty of the owner to get the license plate made in a graphics shop.

The choice of the color scheme is left up to the owner of the vehicle. Most common is the white figures on black background style. Generally, vehicle owners tend to purchase a colour scheme that follows: White or light coloured vehicles get the white surface with black letters whereas Black or dark coloured vehicles get the black surface with white letters. The Font of the figures is very important as well, the sizing of the figures and spacing in between is outlined in the Motor Vehicles and Road Traffic Act.

Apart from the font and colour scheme, various styles of number plates can be bought such as: "Embossed" which are a machine stamped type metal plate that usually cost approximately TT$200 per pair, "Lenny's", a term derived based on the alleged inventor of the style, or "Bones" which are the 3D, beveled letters that can be either black or white affixed to a white or black metal backing this usually costs approximately upwards of $600TT per pair or the regular plastic plates that are made with graphics these usually cost approx $80TT per pair. There are also much other variants such as reflective backgrounds for both "Lenny's" or "Embossed" but those are a bit more expensive. Further to this, there are also physical dimensions of the number plate that are important. Different vehicles may require different types of plates due to physical space available to mount the number plate. Meaning therefore, to select a plate for a vehicle the owner has three different characteristics to consider before doing so such as: colour scheme, style and type. There are two types of number plates that are available: Rectangular and Squared plates:

=== Rectangular Plates ===
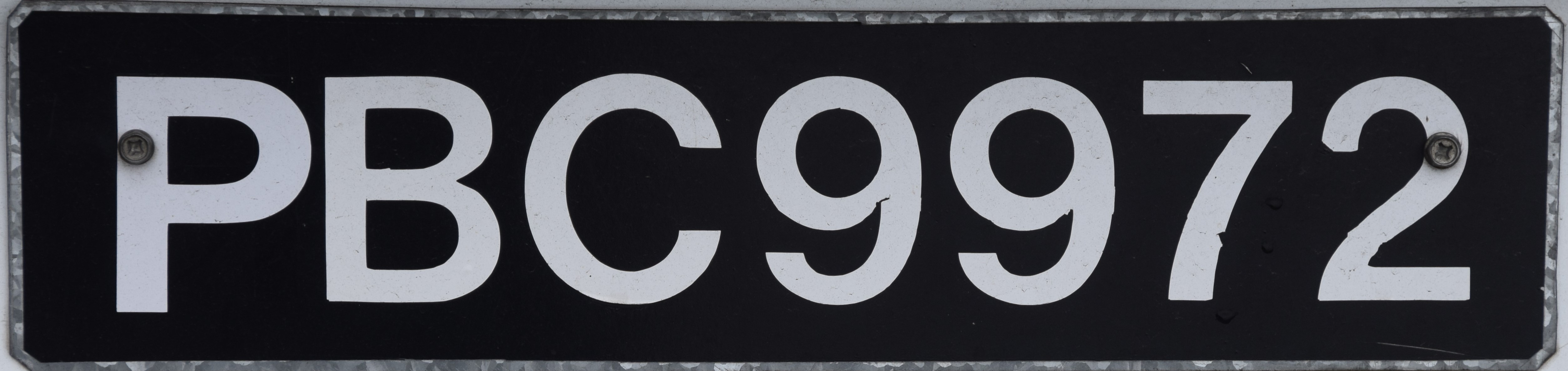
Private Vehicle Rectangular Plate

The rectangular plates have all letters and numbers in one row.

=== Square Plates ===
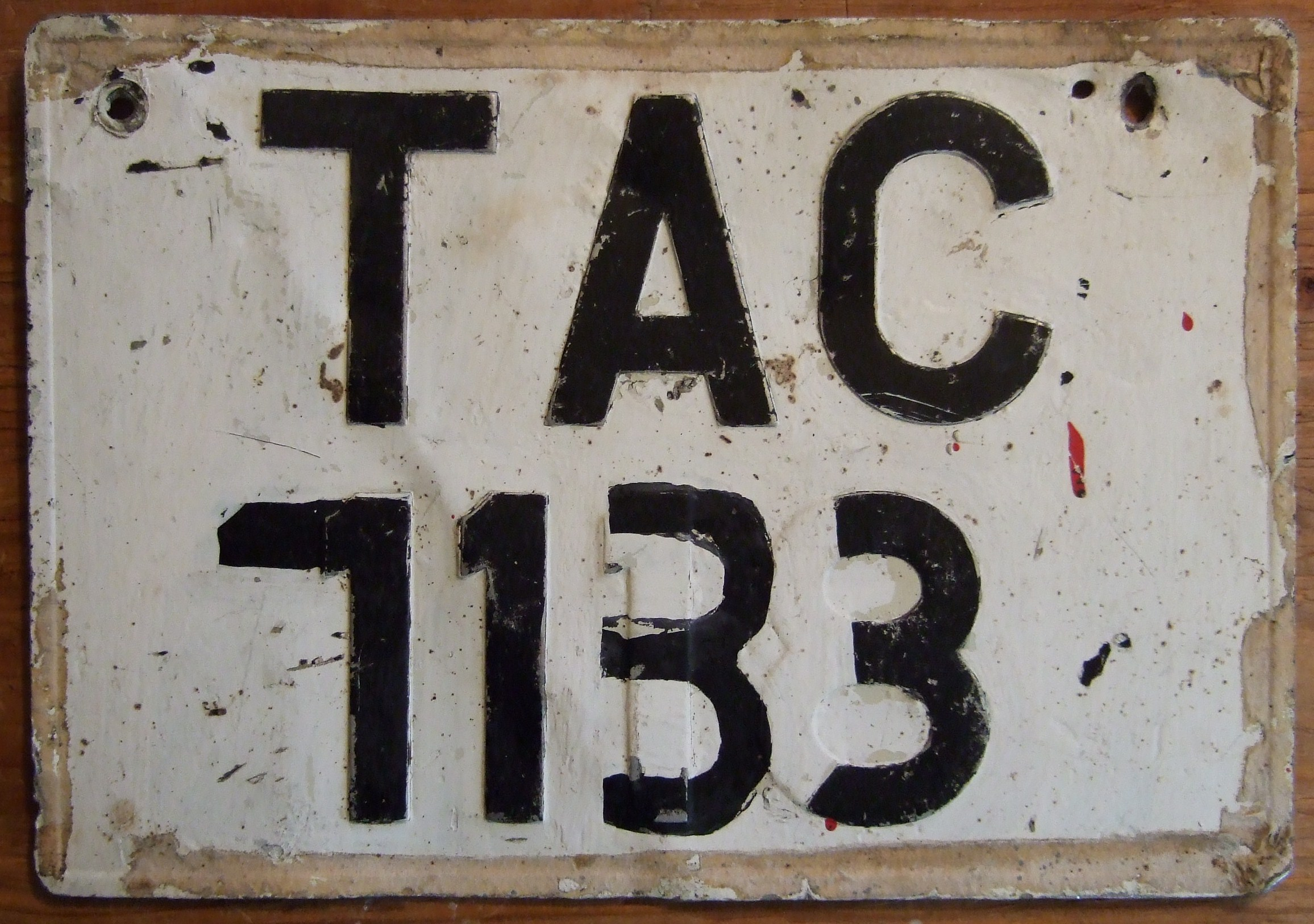
Commercial Vehicle Square Plate

The square plates have the letters and numbers in two rows as shown:

=== Proposed changes in 2014 ===
In April 2014, transport Minister Stephen Cadiz announced that by September 2014, a newly designed license plate, drivers’ permit, and new centres for the registration and licensing of vehicles will become available. He added, the public will see the introduction of new number plates, which will come in 18 designs, with security markings to be manufactured abroad. New registration and validation certificates will be administered and each vehicle entering the country will be tagged with a radio frequency identification marker (RFID) for additional security. This plan was however eventually replaced with a new driving permit which includes holograms and scanning technologies.

== See also ==
- Transport in Trinidad and Tobago
