= Vehicle registration plates of Cyprus =

Republic of Cyprus
- Cypriot regular legal standard number plate.
- Country: Cyprus
- Country code: CY

Current series
- Size: 520 mm × 110 mm 20.5 in × 4.3 in
- Serial format: Not standard
- Colour (front): Black on white
- Colour (rear): Black on yellow

Cypriot standard number plates

Current format since 2013

2004–2013 (rear side)

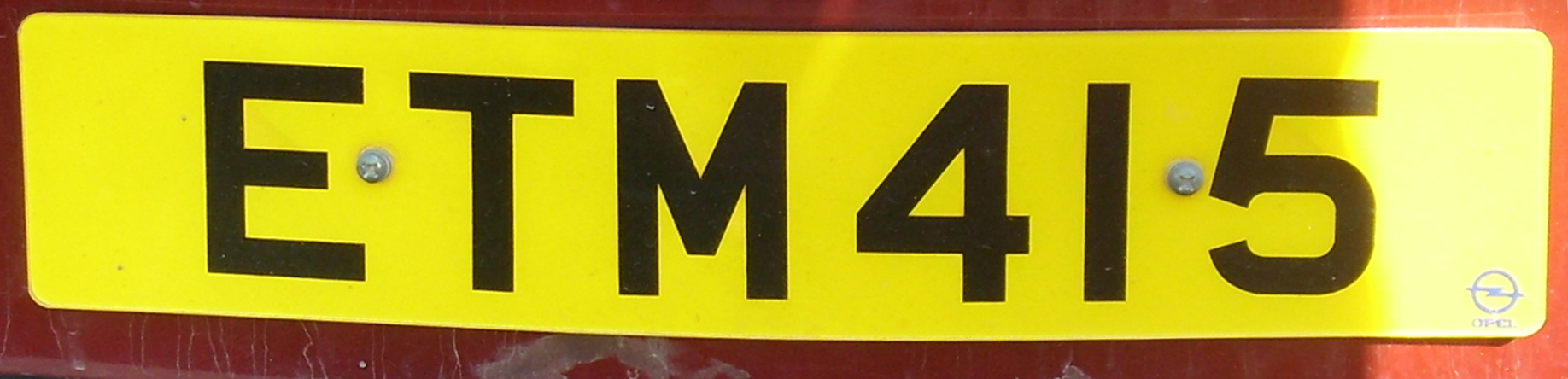
1990–2004 (rear side)

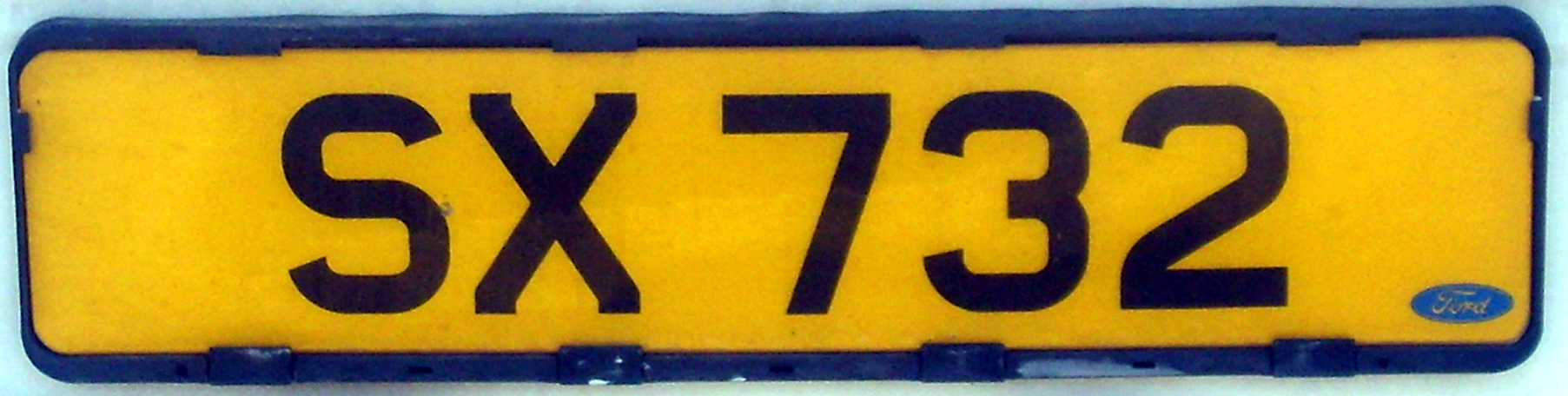
1973–1990 (rear side)

1956–1973

The vehicle registration plates of Cyprus are composed of three letters and three digits (e.g. ABC 123). A simple incremental numbering system is used; numbers run from 001 to 999 per letter sequence (alphabetic), so that, for example, the plate to be issued after MAA 999 would be MAB 001. However, registrants may be allowed to choose a number from available numbers in the extant letter sequence.

The dimensions of Cyprus plates were similar to their British counterparts, and until 2004, characters were printed in black and in the same typeface as used on British plates. Plates from 2004 onwards are made of metal; between 1973 and 2004, they were made of plastic.

A new law on vehicle registration plates came into force on 3 June 2013, altering the design. Plates made before that date are white on the front of the vehicle and yellow on the rear, whereas new plates as of a few years ago, are white both on the front and the rear with 3 letters, and 3 numbers. And, in addition, carry the month and year the vehicle was first registered in any country. The new series began with the combination MAA 001, skipping the remaining Lxx combinations. Replacing old plates with new ones has been made mandatory for motorcycles, taxis and lorries. Taxi plates are yellow on both sides and rental car plates are red on both sides, but no longer carry the T and Z prefix, respectively.

Following Cyprus' entry to the European Union in 2004, plates produced since have a blue band on the left edge with the Union's circle and stars in the top half and the country's international vehicle registration code CY in the bottom half and using German FE-Schrift as the typeface after 2013, replacing the DIN 1451 typeface previously in use as mandatory.

== Style and numbering ==
before 1930

A123

- F for Famagusta
- K for Kyrenia
- LL for Limassol
- N for Nicosia
- P for Paphos
- L for Larnaca

1930 - 1948

N1234

1948 - 1950

1234

1950 - 1956

A123

1956 - 1973

AB123

1973 - 1990

AB 123

AB 123

1990 - 2003

ABC123

ABC123

2003 - 2013

ABC123

ABC123

2013 - today (starting from MAA letter combination introduced in June 2013, only the following letters are used: ABEHKMNPTXYZ.

ABC::123

ABC::123

== Special plates ==
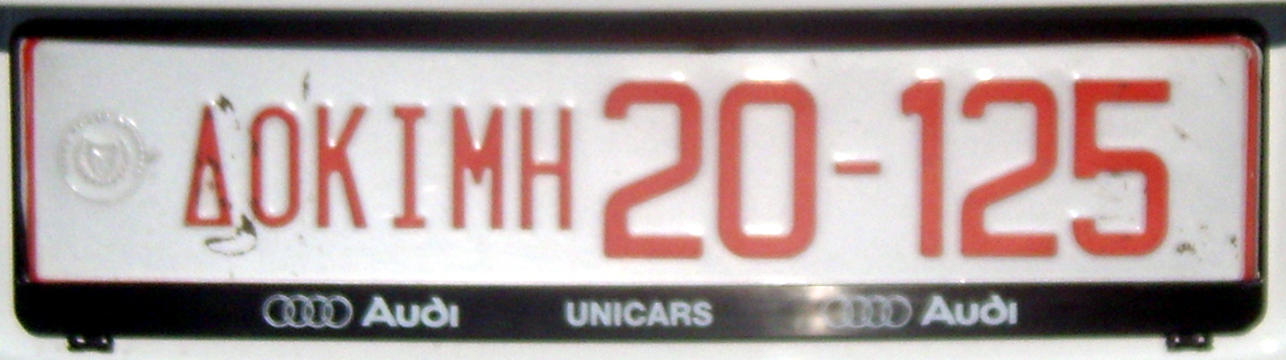
Test drive (car dealer) plate

=== Car dealers ===
1973 - 1990

DL 123

1990 - today

ΔΟΚΙΜΗ 123-123

Dealer plates show the letters ΔΟΚΙΜΗ, which means Test, on a white plate, followed by two sets of numerals, the first being the number of the dealer and the second is a serial number. The only officially-made plates in Cyprus. Formerly, they had the same format as the civilian vehicles, but used the code DL and the characters were written in red colour.

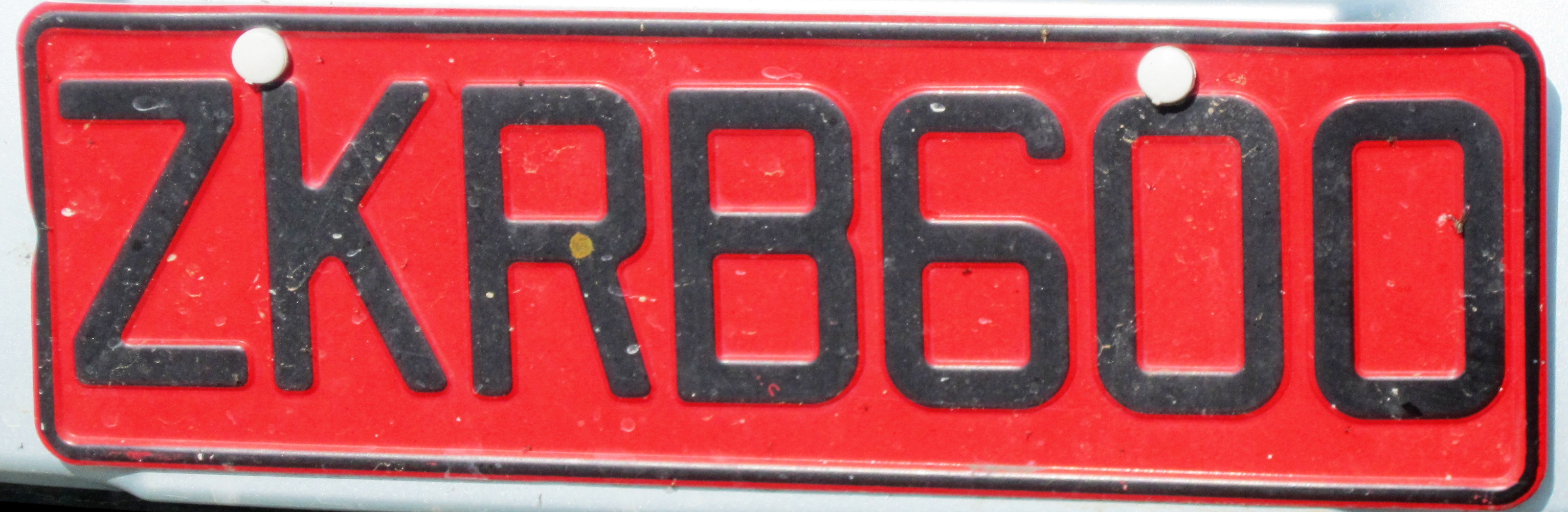
Rental car plate (initial Z omitted after June 2013)

=== Rental & leasing cars ===
1973 - 1990

ZAB123

1990 - 2013

ZABC123

2013 - today

ABE::123

Composed of three letters and three numerals, on a dark red plate. The initial Z prefix was omitted after 2013. Applies to some leasing vehicles post 2020/21.

=== Taxi ===
1973 - 1990

TAB123

1990 - 2003

TABC123

2003 - 2013

TABC123

2013 - today

ABC::123

Composed of three letters and three numerals, on a yellow plate. The initial T prefix was omitted after 2013.

Trailer plates before 2013
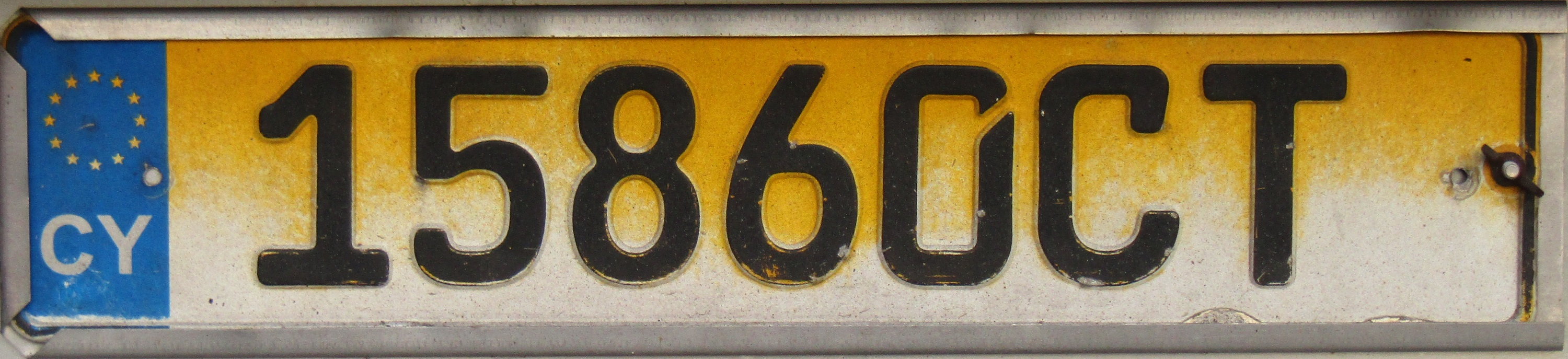
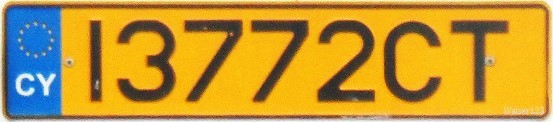
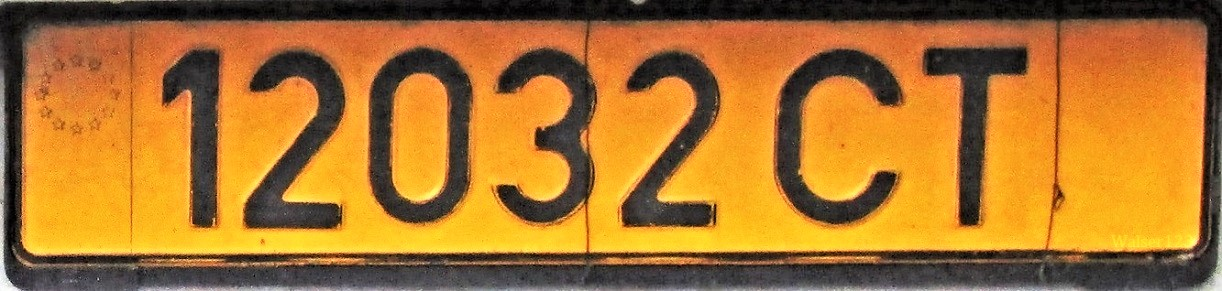
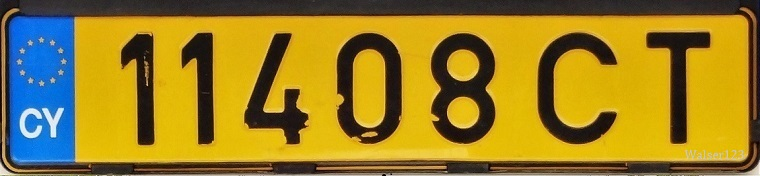
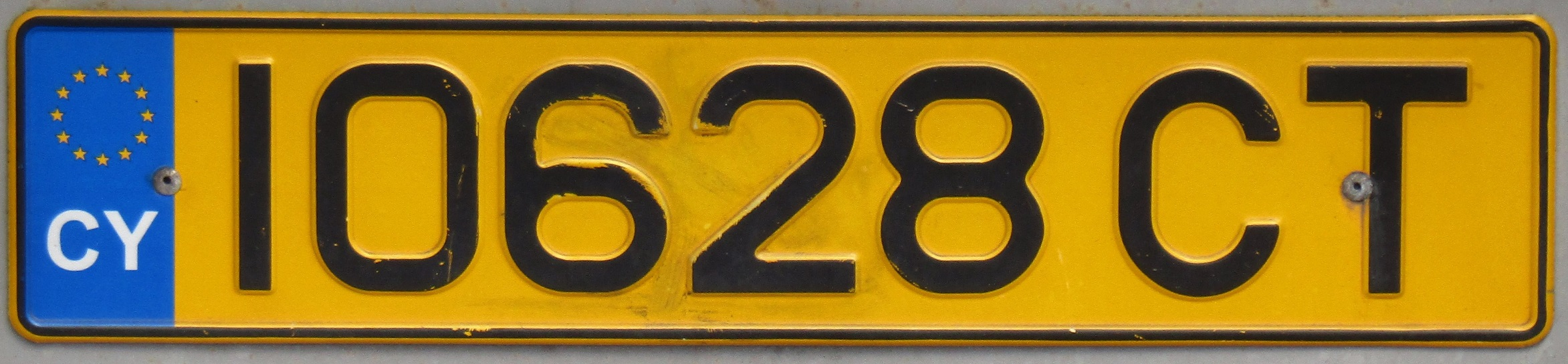
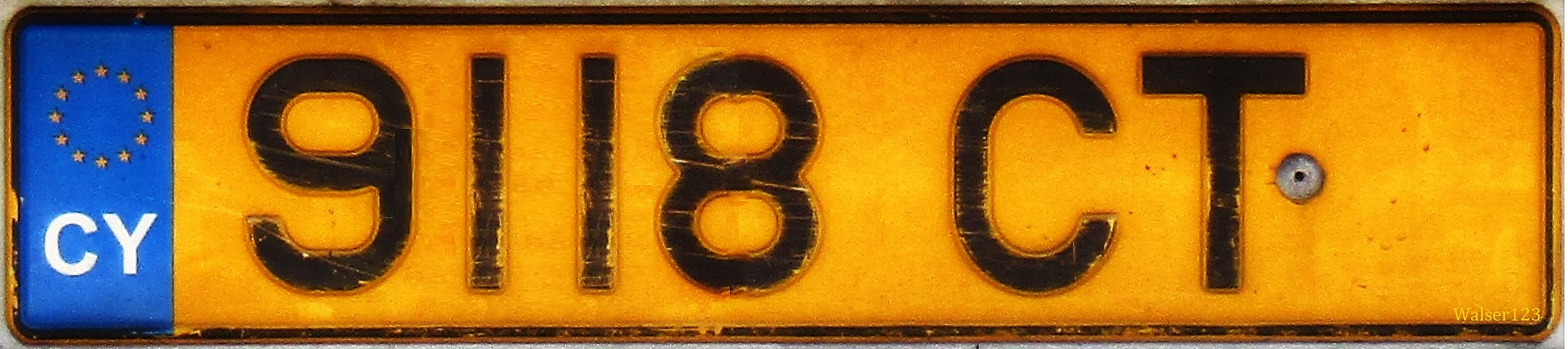
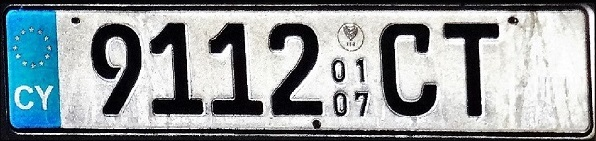
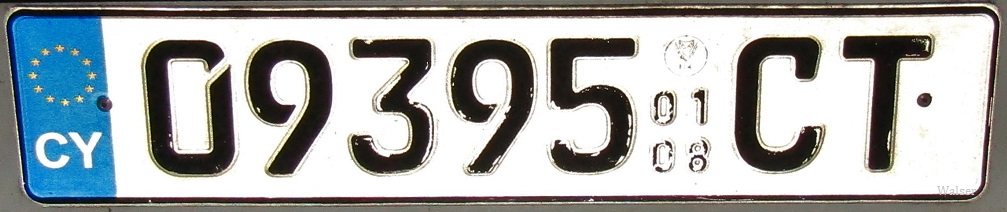
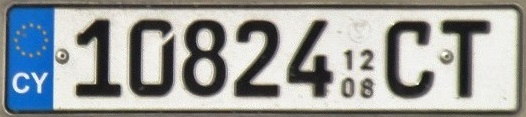
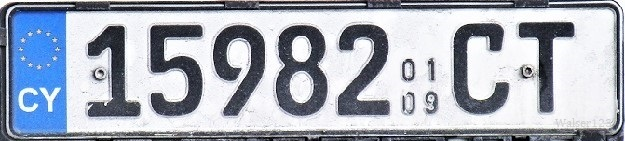

=== Trailers ===
1973 - 2013

1234 TR

12345 CT

1234 CT

12345 CT

12345::CT

Composed of up to five numerals with the suffix CT, on yellow plates. Since 2013, some numbers have been reissued on white plates.

Trailer plates since 2013
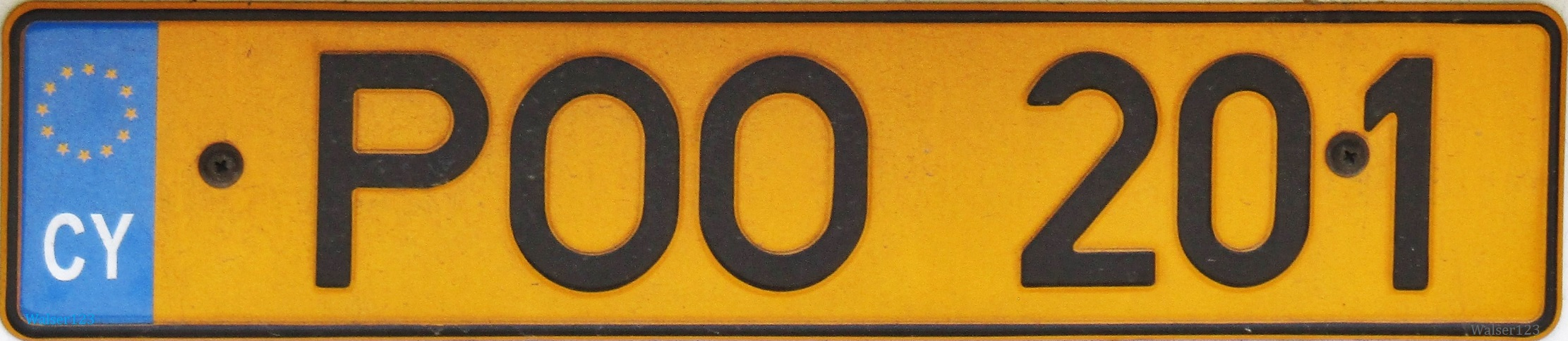
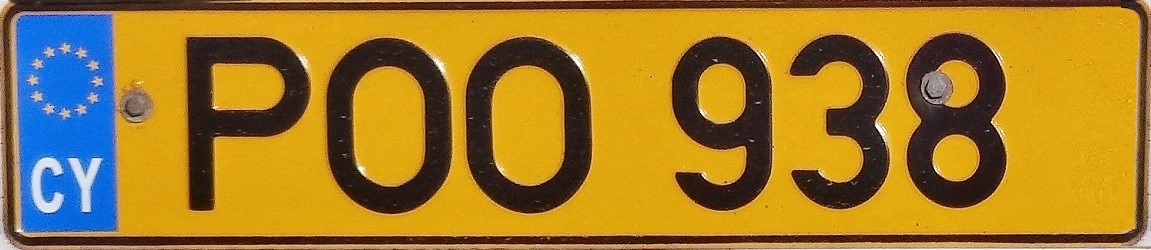
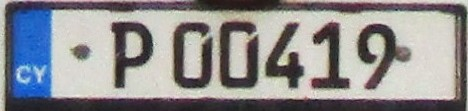
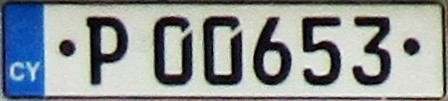
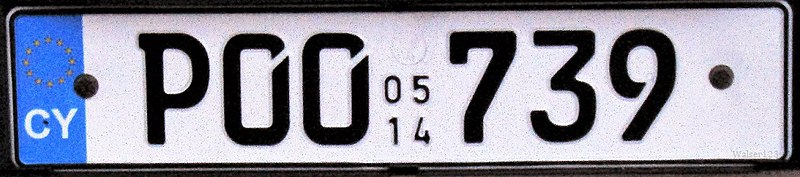
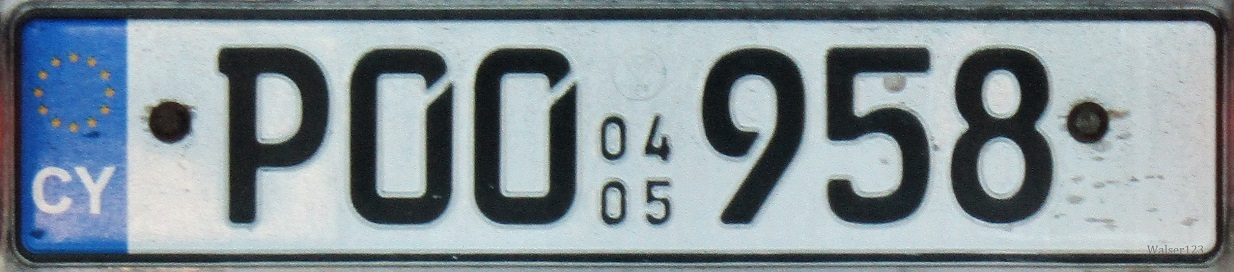
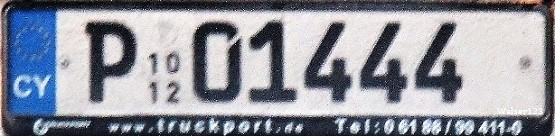
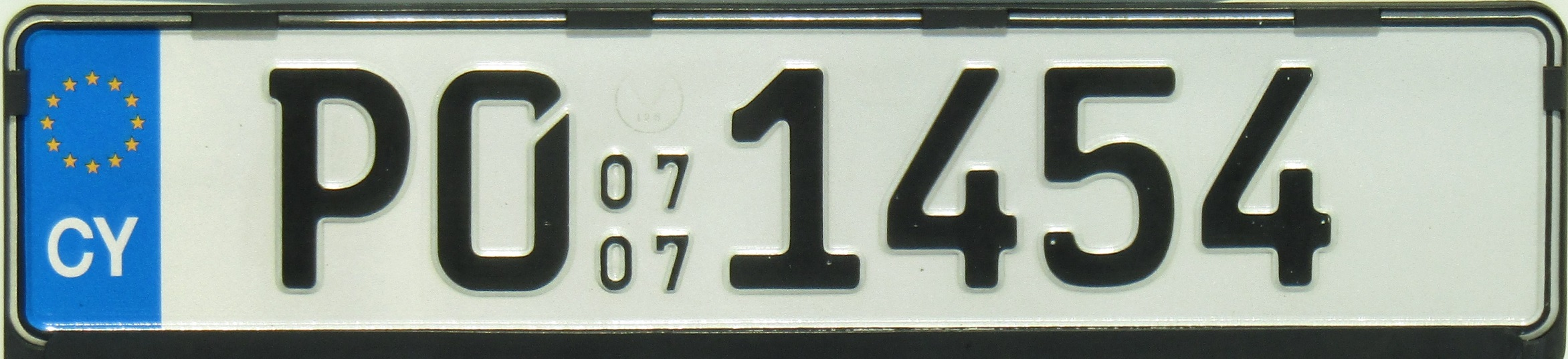
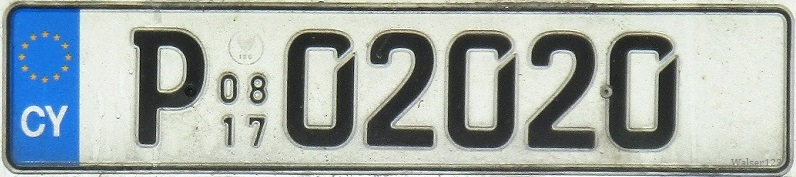
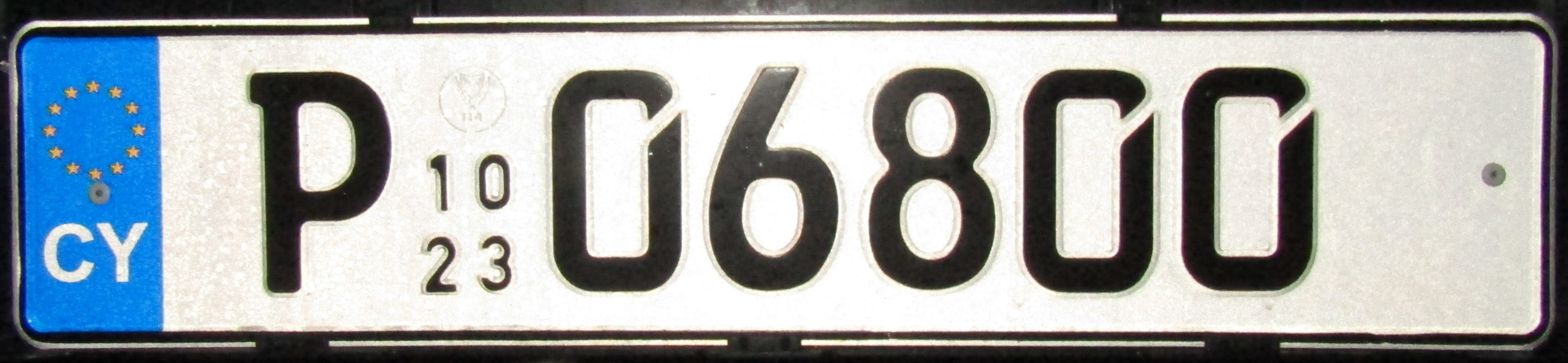

2013 - today

P00 123

P 00123

P00::123

P0::1234

P::01234

Composed of five numerals and the prefix P, on white plates. Some early numbers were printed on remaining yellow plates.

Commercial Truck plates
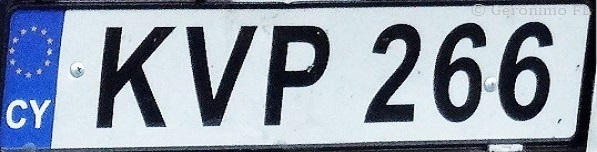
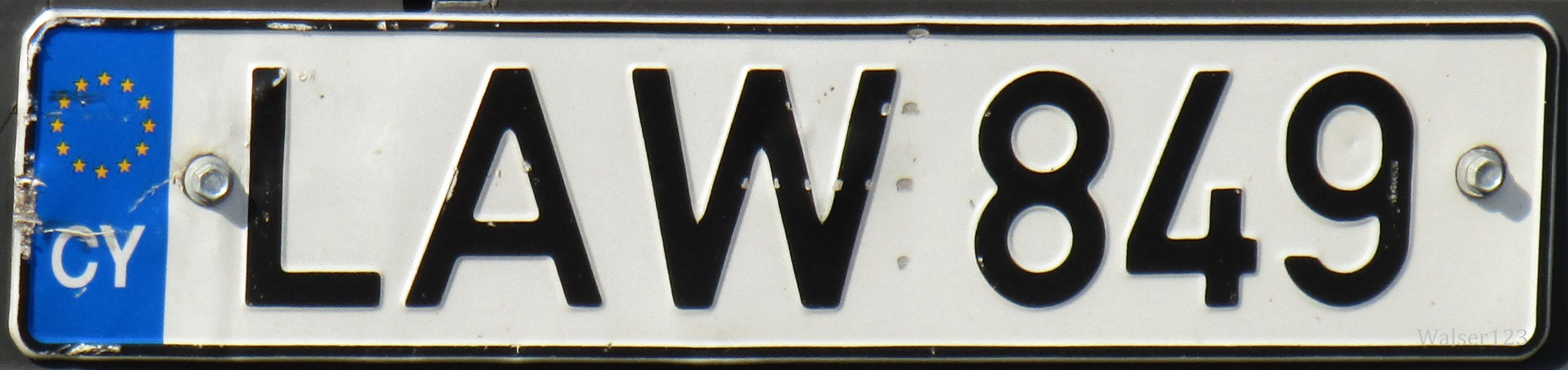
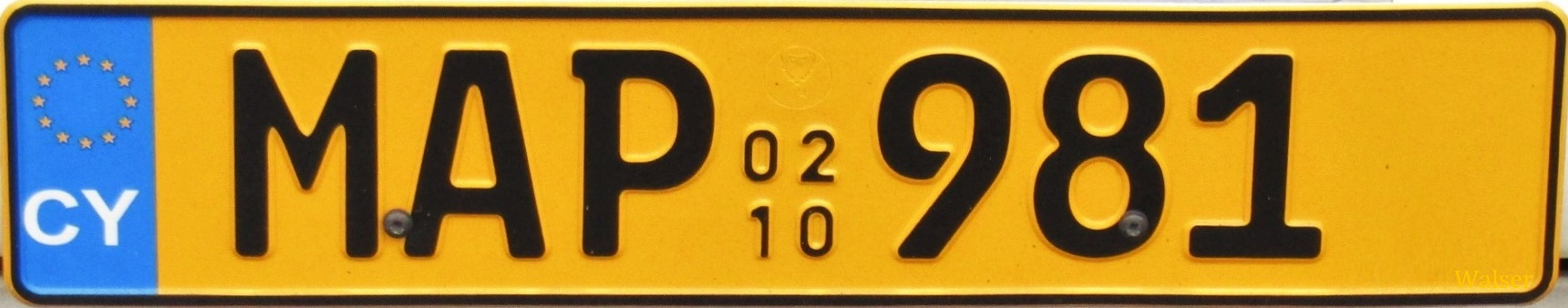
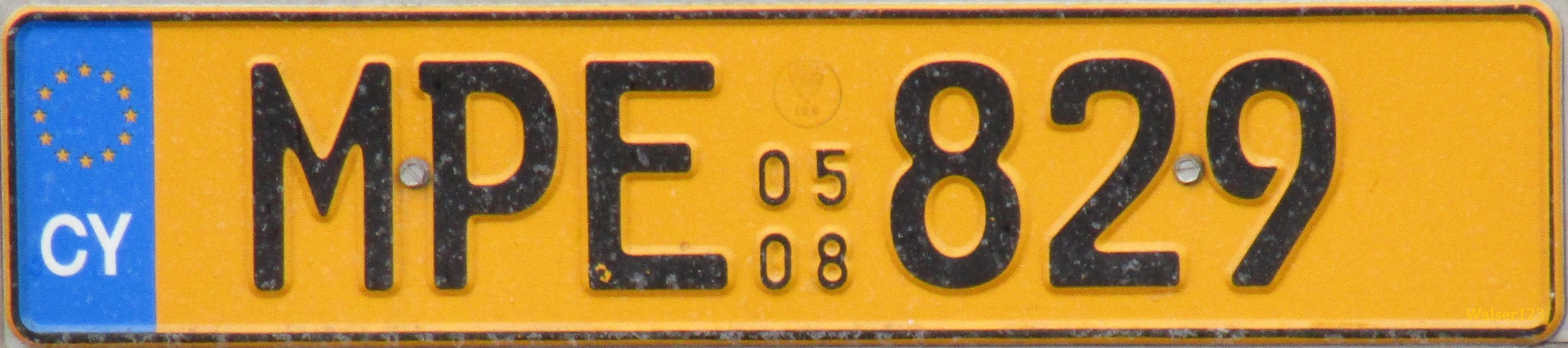
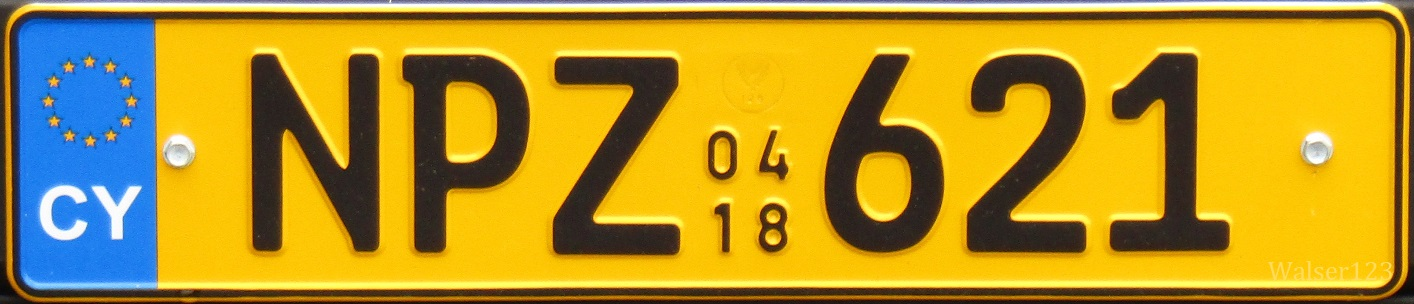
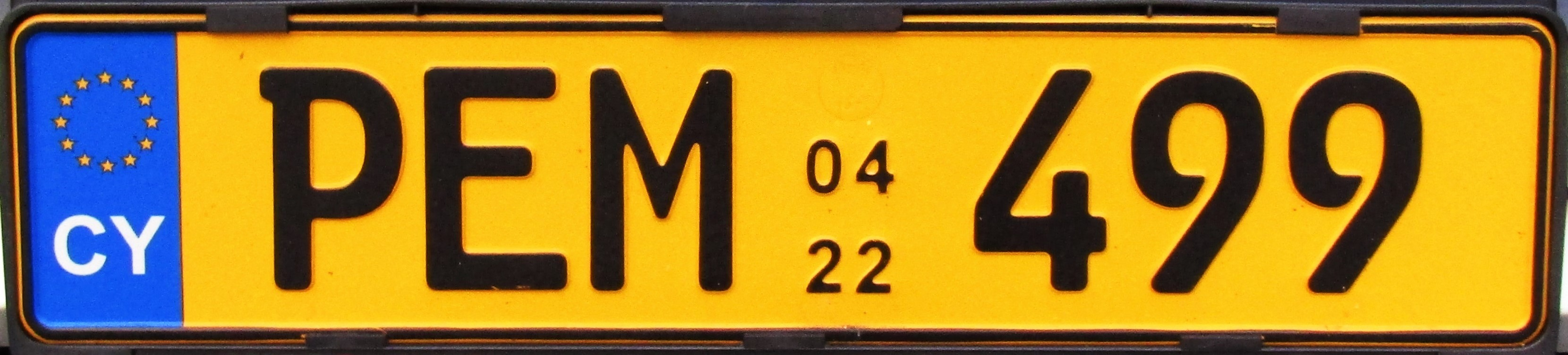

=== Commercial trucks ===
1973 - 1990

AB 123

AB 123

1990 - 2003

ABC123

ABC123

2003 - 2013

ABC 123

ABC 123

2013 - today

ABC::123

ABC::123

Composed of three letters and three numerals, on yellow plates. White front plates were omitted after 2013.

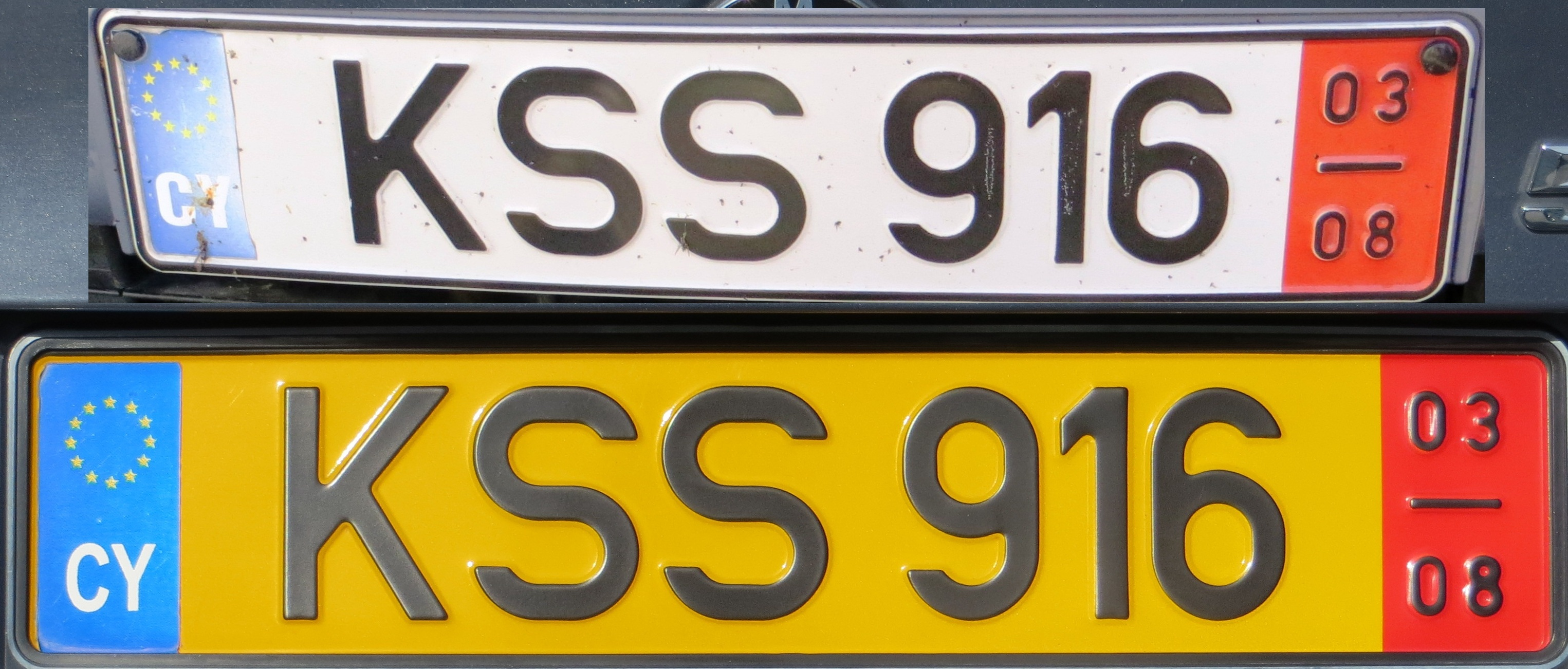
Temporary number plates

=== Temporary / Visitors ===
1973 - 2003

1234V01

1234V01

Up to four numerals followed by the letter V, followed by two numerals indicating the year of registration.
After 2004, you cannot register a car as visitor, but visitor cars registered before 2004 can still get road tax.

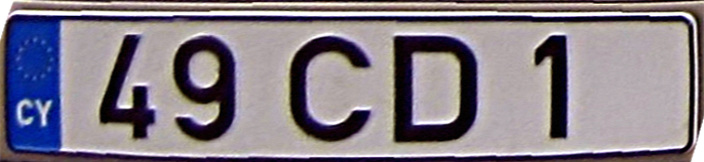
Diplomatic number plate (front), 49 = Netherlands, 1 = Ambassador, CD = (Corps Diplomatique)

=== Diplomatic plates ===
1973 - 1990

^{CD}AB123

1990 - 2004

12 CD 12

12 CD 12

2004 - 2017

12 CD 12

12 CD 12

2017 - today

12CD::123

Composed of a two-digit code for the country (e.g. 29 for Russia or 49 for the Netherlands, followed by two letters (CD, CC or AT) and a serial number with up to three digits. Low serial numbers are used for vehicles of the ambassador of each country. Previously these plates had the same format as civilian plates, on a green base and the prefixes CD, CC or AT.

=== Historical Vehicles ===
2013 - today

AB :: 123

White-on-Black euroband plates for vehicles older than 30 years.

=== Other special plates ===
Public service trucks and buses display secondary plates similar to the Spanish SP plates.
• ΦΔΧ - Φορτηγό Δημοσίας Χρήσης (public service truck) for trucks.
• ΛΔΧ - Λεωφορείο Δημοσίας Χρήσης (public service bus) for buses.

ΦΔΧ

ΛΔΧ

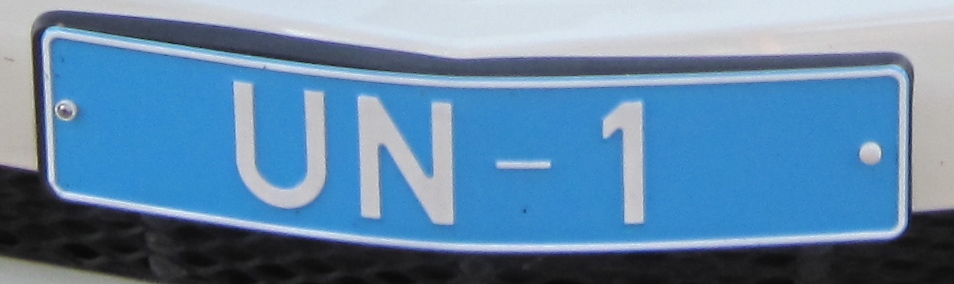
Cypriot UNFICYP number plate

SBAA-22, Akrotiri and Dhekelia police number plate (front)

UNFICYP plates have a blue background and display the prefixes UN or UNF followed by three numerals.

UN-123

UNF-123

Sovereign Base Areas plates are prefixed SBAA followed by two digits, and have adopted the same new colour and typeface as the Republic of Cyprus.

SBAA-12

SBAA-12

Export plates, from 1973 until 1990, showed the letter E followed by four numerals.

E 1234

E 1234

The president's car does not have a number on its plate, it displays the coat of arms of Cyprus instead.

Cypriot National Guard plates are composed of an old version of the Greek flag followed by the letters ΕΦ and up to five digits.

EΦ 12345

== Northern Cyprus ==
Turkish Republic of Northern Cyprus
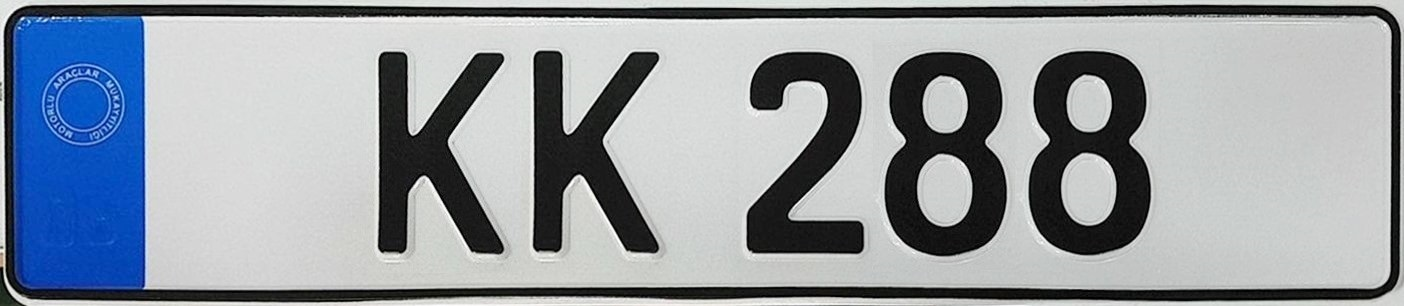
- Northern Cypriot regular legal standard number plate.
- Country: Northern Cyprus
- Country code: None

Current series
- Size: 520 mm × 110 mm 20.5 in × 4.3 in
- Serial format: Not standard
- Colour (front): Black on white
- Colour (rear): Black on white

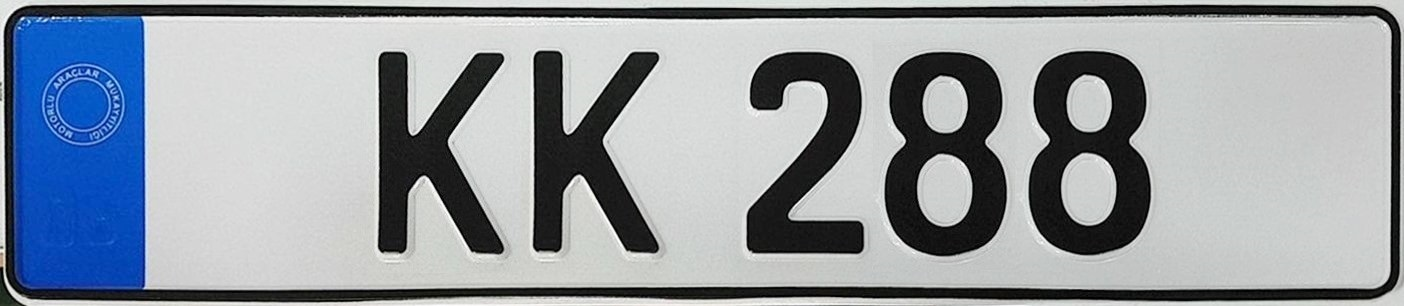
Northern Cyprus plate

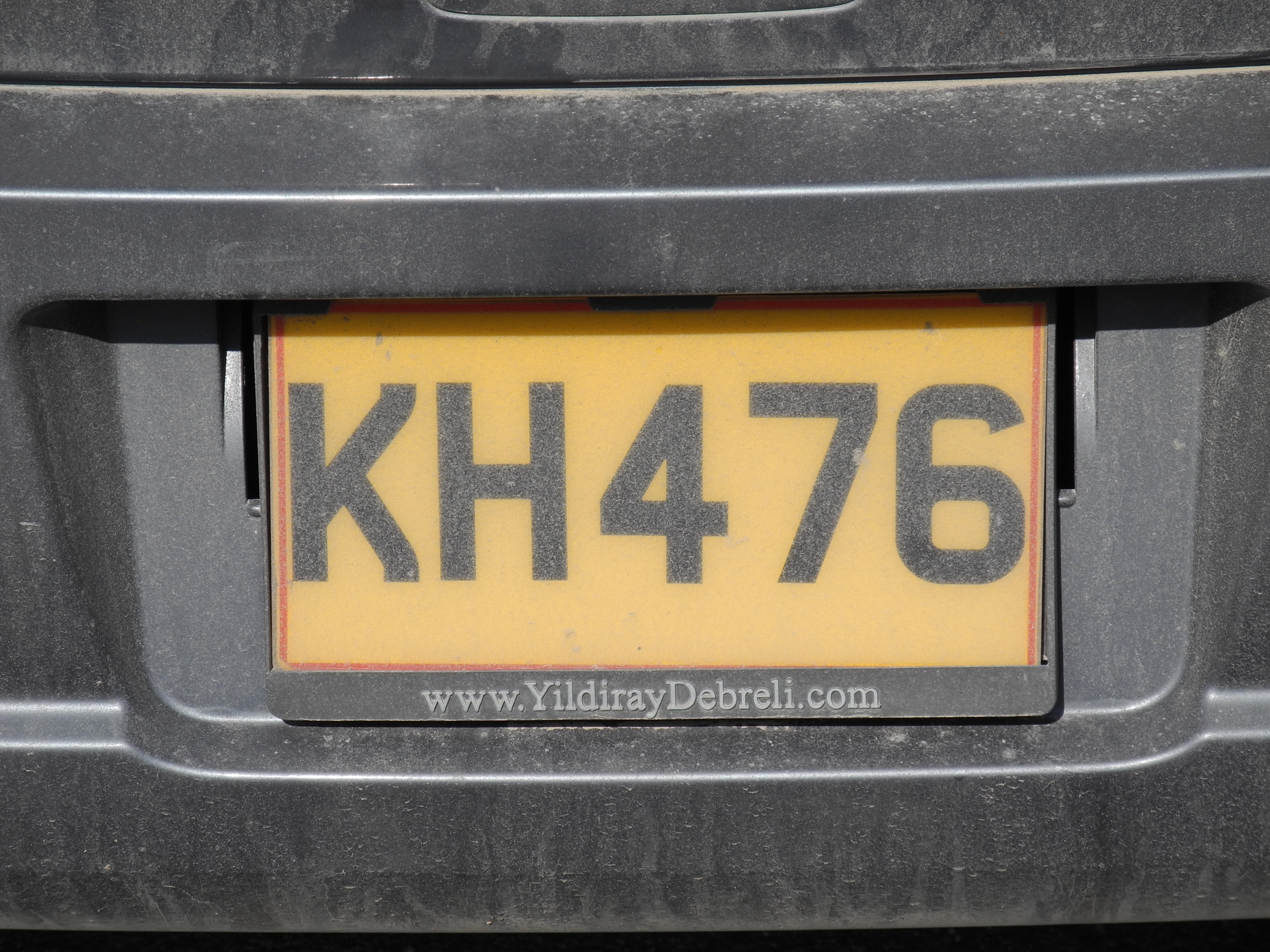
Northern Cyprus rear plate

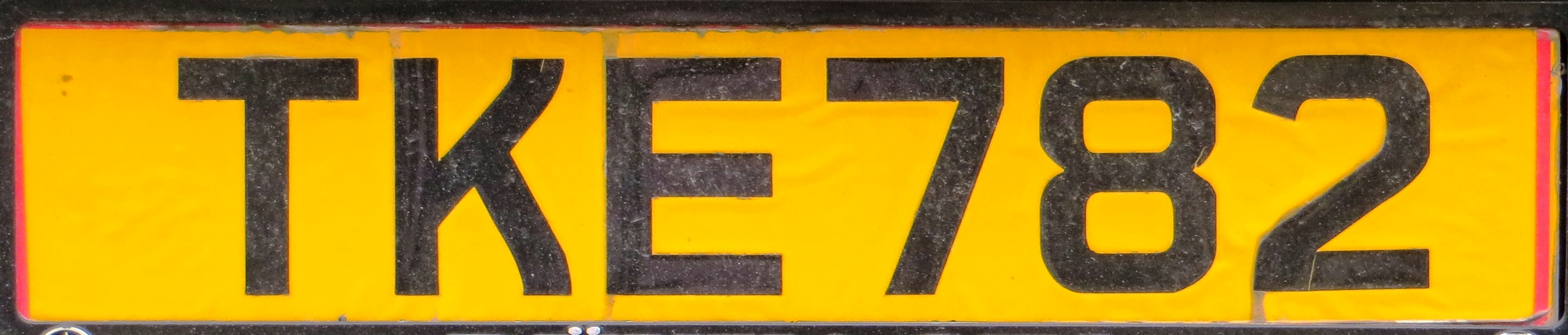
Taxi number plate (T)

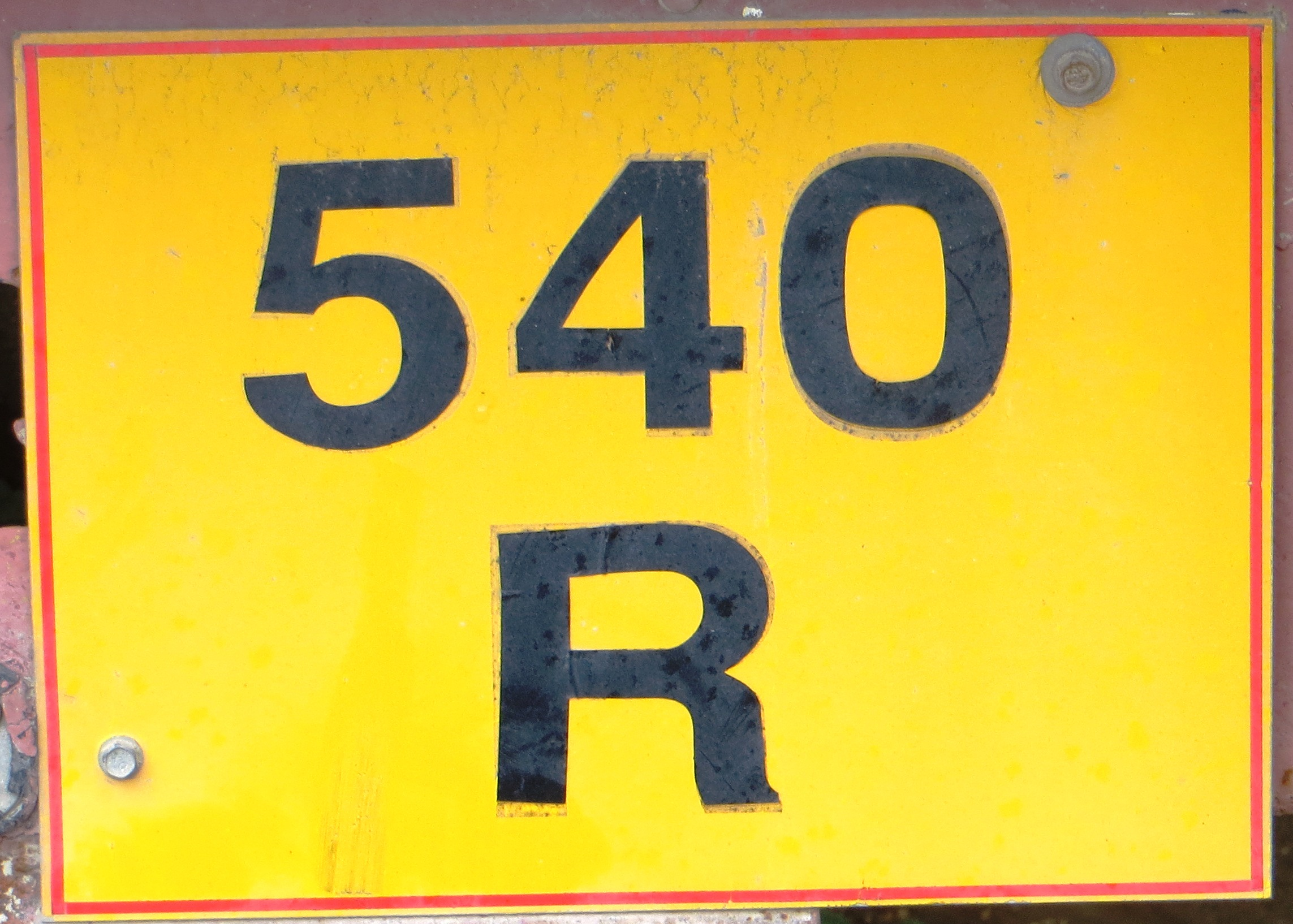
Trailer number plate (R)

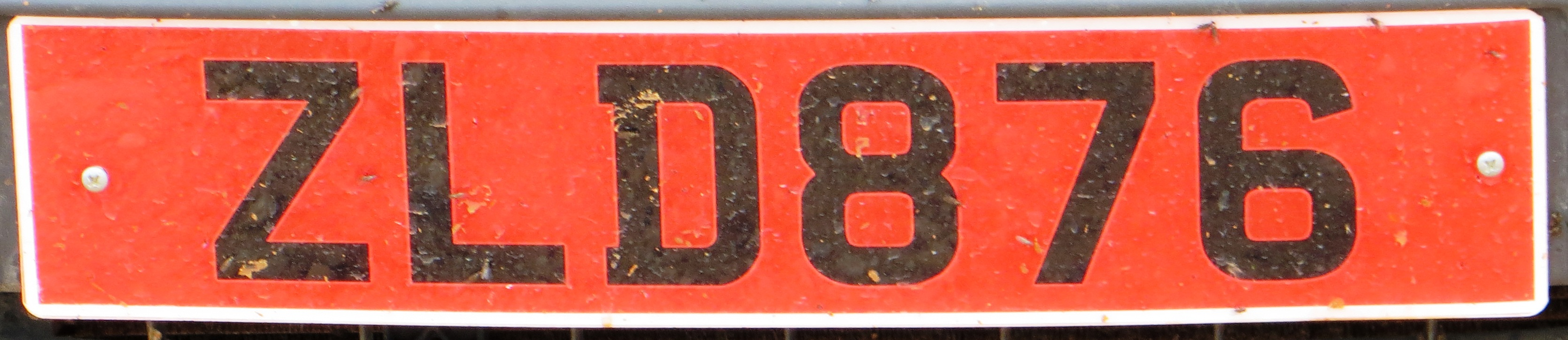
Rental car number plate

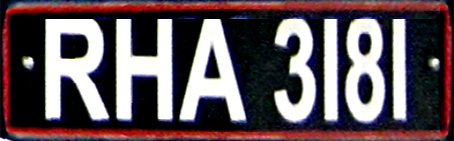
Police number plate

=== Style and numbering ===
Northern Cyprus civilian number plates still use the old format (1973–1990) of Cyprus number plates (AB 123).
Until 2018 front plates were white, rear plates yellow, both bordered in red. Two sizes are available: 300×150 mm or 520×110 mm. Some personalized plates have been seen on the road.

From 2018 both front and rear number plates are white with embossed black letters and numbers, and a blue stripe on the left. The stripe must contain the stamp of the Motor Vehicles Registrar (Turkish: Motorlu Araçlar Mukayyitliği) and the registration number of the number plate manufacturers. It is using a very light color, so it is not always easily visible. Number plates had to be changed before the end of January 2019.

1973 - 2018

2018 - today

=== Special plates ===
Taxis

TAB 123

Taxi plates show the prefix T, followed by two letters and three digits, formerly one letter only.

Trailer

123 R

Trailer plates show three numerals and the letter R.

Rental vehicles

1973 - 2018

2018 - today

Rental car plates have black signs on a red base, they show a prefix Z, followed by two letters and three digits.

Government / Police

1973 - 2018

RHA 1234

RHA 1234

2018 - today

Government and council vehicle registrations show black signs on a white base, composed of the three letters RHA and up to four numerals. Police and Fire Brigade number plates follow the same format, but with inversed colours, with white signs on a black base.

Army

1234567

Number plates of vehicles of Northern Cypriot armed forces are composed of seven numerals, with white signs on a small black plate.

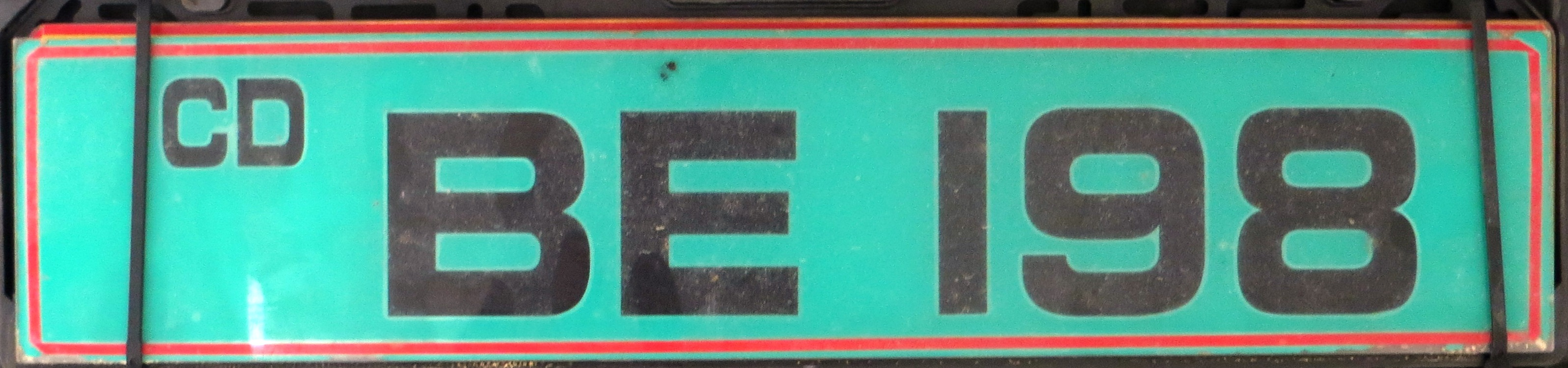
Diplomatic plate (CD)

Diplomatic plates

1973 - 2018

^{CD}AB123

2018 - today

Diplomatic plates have the same format as civilian plates, but on a green base and with a CD prefix. Consulates follow the same format but uses CC instead of CD.

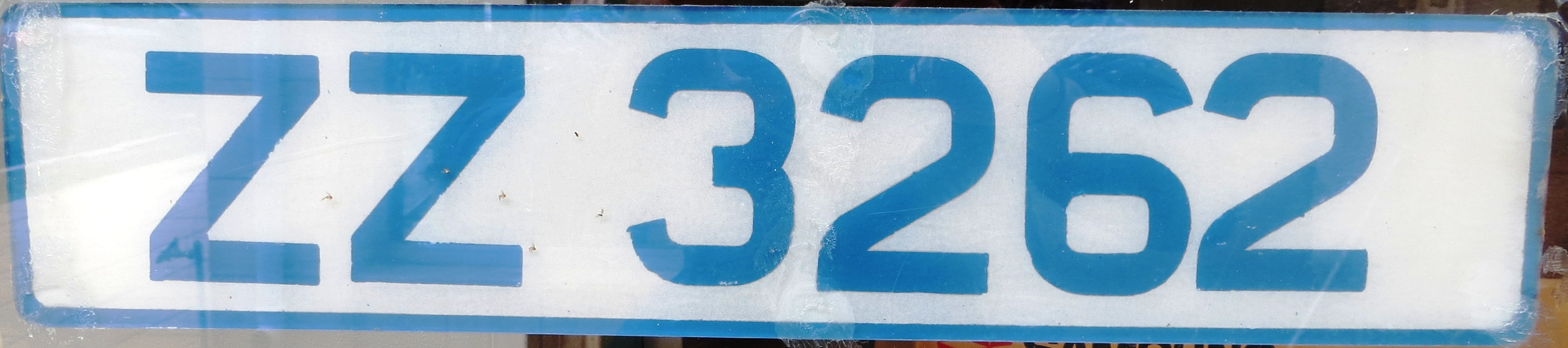
Visitor number plate (ZZ)

Visitor

1973 - 2018

ZZ 1234

2018 - today

Visitor plates have red characters with the prefix ZZ and up to four numerals. Until 2018 they had blue characters.

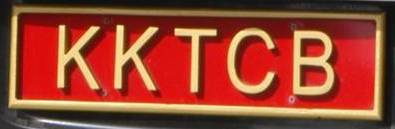
Presidential plate until 2015

Temporary

1973 - 2018

ZT 1234 A

2018 - today

Temporary plates have red characters and border with the prefix ZT, and up to four numerals followed by one letter.

President

1973 - 2018

2018 - today

Previously, the presidential plate did not have a number, just the abbreviation of KKTCB (Turkish: Kuzey Kıbrıs Türk Cumhuriyeti Başkanı).
This was changed in 2015, with the coat of arms being displayed in gold on a red plate.
