= FE-Schrift =

Typeface designed for vehicle licence plates

Fälschungserschwerende Schrift
- Category: Sans-serif
- Designer: Karlgeorg Hoefer
- Foundry: Bundesanstalt für Straßenwesen
- Date created: 1978–1980
- Glyphs: 102
- Also known as: FE-Schrift; Schrift für Kfz-Kennzeichen
- Sample

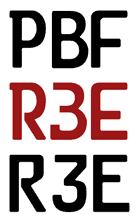
A demonstration of attempted alteration of characters set in the FE-Schrift typeface. The series "PBF" (top row) is modified to read "R3E" (middle row, in red). The correct appearance of the series "R3E" is shown in the bottom row.

The FE-Schrift, or Fälschungserschwerende Schrift (German pronunciation: [fɛlʃʊŋsɐʃveːʁəndə ʃʁɪft], 'forgery-impeding typeface'), is a sans serif typeface introduced for use on license plates. Its monospaced letters and numbers are slightly disproportionate to prevent easy modification and to improve machine readability. The typeface was developed in West Germany and it has been mandatory on German license plates since November 2000.

The abbreviation "FE" is derived from the compound German adjective fälschungserschwerend combining the noun Fälschung ('falsification') and the verb erschweren ('to hinder'). Schrift means 'typeface' in German (cognate with the English word script). Other countries have later introduced the same or a derived typeface for license plates, taking advantage of the proven design for the FE-Schrift.

== Development ==
The motivation for the creation of the typeface arose in the late 1970s in the light of terrorism by the Red Army Faction when it was discovered that with the then-standard font for vehicle registration plates—the DIN 1451 font—it was particularly easy to modify letters by applying a small amount of black paint or tape. For example, it was easy to change a "P" to an "R" or "B", a "3" to an "8", or an "L" or "F" to an "E". Modifications to FE-font plates are somewhat more difficult, as they also require the use of white paint, which is easily distinguished at a distance from the retroreflective white background of the plate, in particular at night.

The original design for the FE-Schrift typeface was created by Karlgeorg Hoefer who was working for the Bundesanstalt für Straßenwesen (Federal Highway Institute of Germany) at the time. The typeface was slightly modified according to the results of tests that lasted from 1978 to 1980 at the University of Giessen (Department of Physiology and Cybernetic Psychology). For example, the initial slashed zero ($\emptyset$) could be mistaken for an 8, so Hoefer replaced it by a design with a reduced white slash in the upper right corner. Whilst the DIN typeface used a proportional font, the FE-Schrift is a monospaced font (with different spacing for letters and numbers) for improved machine readability. Faked FE-Schrift letters (e.g., "P" to "R") appear conspicuously disproportionate.

Another motivation for the new typeface came from a spike in the theft rate of license plates in the early 1970s. And despite the requirement to hinder falsification, the scope document did list that point only in the second place. The first priority was a requirement for readability by humans and machines as the decade was the same that saw the development of other typefaces for optical character recognition, namely OCR-A and OCR-B. The RAF terrorism however allowed to fund a project over a couple of years — running from the functional scope document being created in 1977 to the final decision of 1982 not to introduce the design on license plates. It ended up in the drawer.

The final publication in German law for the usage on license plates includes three variants – normal script (Mittelschrift) with 75 mm high and 47.5 mm wide letters and 44.5 mm wide digits (2 15/16 in × 1 7/8 in × 1 3/4 in), narrow script (Engschrift) with 75 mm high and 40.5 mm wide letters and 38.5 wide digits (2 15/16 in × 1 5/8 in × 1 1/2 in) and a small script (verkleinerte Mittelschrift) with 49 mm high and 31 mm wide letters and 29 mm wide digits (2 5/16 in × 1 1/4 in × 1 1/8 in). The legal typeface includes umlaut vowels as these occur in German county codes at the start of the license plate number. The narrow font allows nine characters to be put on a standard Euro license plate — shorter numbers are supposed to be printed with larger spaces between characters as to fill the available space on the plate.

The German law defines the font in Anlage 4 ('appendix 4') of the Fahrzeugzulassungsverordnung ('vehicle admission ordinance'). In section 2.1 it shows three names for it as fälschungserschwerende Schrift, FE-Schrift and Schrift für Kfz-Kennzeichen ('font for license plates') with the latter to be used for requesting templates from the Bundesanstalt für Straßenwesen (BASt, 'Federal Highway Research Institute'). Digital variants have never been published by them but there exist third party digitizations for free download, for example the font "Euro Plate".

== Adoption process ==
When the FE-Schrift was finished in 1980 the pressure for its adoption had lessened already. Its distribution was furthered by another event being the introduction of the Euro license plate. With the fall of the Iron Curtain there was again a spike in the theft rate of license plates, including cars being stolen and moved to Eastern Europe. Again there was a motivation to prevent that with new regulations on license plates. In the new process the officials found the FE-Schrift which was fully developed and a perfect match for the automatic number-plate recognition technology that had developed to a usable state at the time.

Some of the federal states in the eastern part of Germany introduced the new design during 1994 in anticipation of the national resolution. In January 1995 it was introduced nationwide by a federal law that came to include the FE-Schrift as well as it had been in the planning since the 1970s. The shift in legislation matches with the first Schengen zone to lift borders during 1995. With the extension of the Schengen zone in 1998 the new license plate design found EU-wide acceptance (even for non-Schengen countries) thereby lifting the older requirement of adding an extra country code plate on the car when roaming to other countries which constitutes an advantage to citizens. Shortly later the option to be issued an old (non-Euro) license plate design were dropped on 1 November 2000 and the legislation dropped the older typeface for license plates alongside. The FE-Schrift is mandatory in Germany since that time although older license plates continue to be valid. There is an exception for historic cars to get a new license plate in the DIN typeface, and the Bundeswehr armed forces continue to generally issue their plates in the DIN typeface.

Other countries have begun to introduce a forgery-impeding script as well, either directly adopting the FE-Schrift or using a derivative variant. Taking over the original design, including the Euro license plate format, is generally cost effective – while in many countries the car license plates are produced by the state it is not the case in Germany. In Germany the car owner has to pay for a new license plate which gets a license stamp to be valid on the road (the round stamp is placed between county code and the local registration code). In the vicinity of the vehicle registration offices several small shops compete to press a license plate on the spot – their printing machines are highly standardized and the German license plate design is tailored to allow for cheap production in high quality.

Specifically in Europe some countries started to adopt the style of registration plates of the European Union even before becoming full members. The main difference is that EU registrations plates may bear a circle of stars as present in the European Union flag. The usage of stars is however completely optional, even after becoming a full member. The license plates may not need to be changed to be valid but new license plates may be issued with that hint to the EU membership.

In October 2014 the members of the Mercosur South American trade bloc agreed to introduce a common design for license plates. They adopted a size of 400 millimetres (16 in) x 130 millimetres (5.1 in) similar to that used in Australia and China. The design uses the narrow script Engschrift FE-Schrift design to show the registration code with 7 elements. The FE-Schrift was found to perform better against alteration and falsification in comparison to the Brazilian Mandatory script as shown in a test at the INTI. The design also includes a blue strip above the registration code with the Mercosur emblem in the left upper corner, the national flag of the member state in the right upper corner, and the country name printed in the center. It was agreed to introduce the Mercosur design by 2016. The actual introduction was delayed until 2018.

The early adoption in Africa is based on proposals against falsified and stolen license plates made by the German Utsch AG, which had also developed the retroreflective plates for Germany, and which was able to deliver the embossing machines for plates with FE-Schrift as they were already in mass production for the national market in 1994/95. In South Africa the empty license plates had been delivered with a special certification mark from the beginning, which would tell if a plate is authorized for embossing by licensed plate makers (today the certification mark contains a QR code). In other regions the car owner will get a third "license plate mark" being a sticker for the front window that can not be removed non-destructively and where the sticker does also contain all the license plate information (some of latest variants even integrate an RFID chip containing the information).

== Usage ==
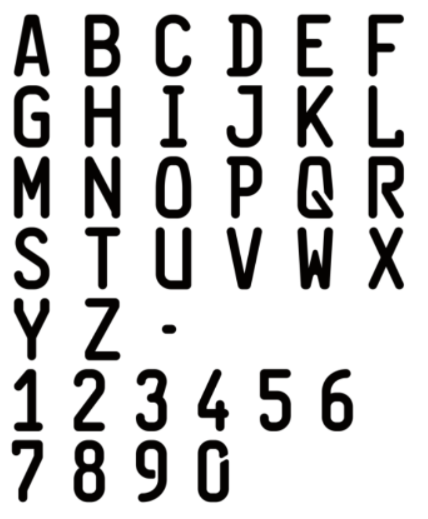
Variant of the FE-Schrift as used on Hungarian license plates since 2022

- On Euro-style license plates with the country code in a blue section on the left:
  - Germany — introduced in 1995 and are mandatory since 2000
  - Bosnia and Herzegovina — in 2009 the new Euro-style license plate design was introduced along with the FE-Schrift typeface. The new design (dropping the national crest from the old Euro-style license plates as it was used since 1998) is more similar to the Euro license plate
  - Malta — since 2004, the Euro-style license plate design was introduced in 1995 without the FE-Schrift
  - Cyprus — since 3 June 2013
  - Akrotiri and Dhekelia — since 2014
  - Northern Cyprus — since 2018
  - Georgia — since 3 June 2013
  - Latvia — for tractors and tractor trailers only. On passenger car, car trailer, and motorcycle plates, they continue to use DIN 1451.
  - Cuba — resolved a law on a new license plate scheme in 2013 which opted for the Euro license plate format and the FE-Schrift. The reasoning is to lower the cost while increasing the quality of the plates, with the change to be completed by May 2016.
  - Moldova — since 1 April 2015
- Common design in CIS countries with a region code section along with the country name and flag
  - Uzbekistan — since 2009
  - Armenia — since 2014
  - Kyrgyzstan — since 2016
- Common design of Mercosur countries with the country name in a blue strip above the number:
  - Uruguay — the old numbering scheme with three digits was exhausted in 2001 leading to a new scheme in 2002 in Montevideo which included four digits and came to use the FE-Schrift as well. The new license plate design is mandatory for Uruguay since 2011. Uruguay selected the blue strip of the Mercosur design in March 2015 for new license plates.
  - Argentina — using the Mercosur design since 2016
  - Paraguay — was scheduled to use the Mercosur design for new cars by 2016, but delayed the start to 2019
  - Brazil — using the Mercosur design since September 2018, first state was Rio de Janeiro
  - Bolivia — since April 2017 it is allowed to get Mercosur-style license plates as they were defined 2014 in order to ease goods traffic with Peru
  - Venezuela — with introduction date in the former Mercosur member state being unknown (Mercosur membership suspended since 2016)
- Countries in Africa:
  - South Africa — the numbering scheme and license plate design were changed in 1994 which did also introduce the FE-Schrift
  - Namibia — since 1994, following South African style but with new registration codes that start with "N"
  - Tanzania — started to introduce a new design in the 1990s using FE-Schrift, registration codes start with "T"
  - Uganda — since 1999, registration codes start with "U"
  - Sierra Leone — probably since 1999
  - Mozambique — probably around 2000s, registration codes start with "M"
  - Zambia — since 2000
  - Ethiopia — probably since 2002, numbers only
  - Cameroon — since 2005
  - Zimbabwe — since 2006
  - Rwanda — since 2007, registration codes start with "R"
  - South Sudan — probably since 2007, initially only used on government vehicles
  - Mali — probably since 2008
  - Congo — since 2009
  - Burundi — since April 2009
  - Malawi — probably since 2011
  - Senegal
  - Gambia
  - Guinea
  - Ghana
  - Niger
  - Kenya — since 2022
  - Madagascar — since 2014
  - Benin — since 2019
  - Djibouti — since 2023
  - Burundi
  - Eswatini
  - Somaliland
- Other countries:
  - Sri Lanka — since August 2000, with a variation of the FE-Schrift developed by a German company
  - Abu Dhabi in the United Arab Emirates — probably since 2006, numbers only
  - Kuwait — probably since 2007, numbers only
  - Guatemala — probably since 2008
  - Bahrain — since 2010
  - Panama — since 2018
  - Peru — since 2010
  - Chile — since 2014
  - Colombia — since 2016 for diplomatic cars only
  - Nepal — implemented since 2017 and fully since 2020
  - Honduras — since 2018
  - Philippines — since February 2018 for regular plates and since 2010 for personalized plates
  - Yemen — since 2018 for alphanumeric officially used on newer plates (except Taiz Governorate and Houthi rebel-controlled areas in northern Yemen) (Note: Serif typeface unofficially used for alphanumeric alongside FE-Schrift.)
  - Aruba — since 2019
  - Indonesia — since August 2019 for personalized plates and November 2022 for regular plates and used in four wheel and more in the late of 2022 and motorcycle in 2025
  - Gaza Strip — since 2021
  - Australia — personalised "Euro-style plates" used FE-Schrift issued by some states (New South Wales since 2002 and Victoria since 2005)
  - Thailand — since 2020
  - Ecuador — since 2022
  - Iraq — since 2022
  - Malaysia — since September 2024 for electric vehicles only
  - Syria — since 2024, numbers only

Some countries allow the FE-Schrift as an alternative to the standard typeface especially in combination with a Euro-style license plate. Some license plates in Ghana have been issued using an FE-Schrift style. In Australia, personalized plates may be issued with an FE-Schrift using a special design of vanity plates. In other countries, such as Algeria and Ireland, FE-Schrift is permissible where registration plates are owner provided, under their prescribed design regulations. Such plates were allowed in India until 2019.

Some countries have developed a typeface for license plates with similar features: Albania since 2002, Georgia since 2014, Guinea, Hungary since 2022, New Zealand, Netherlands, Serbia and Slovenia (from 2004 until 2008).

== Examples ==
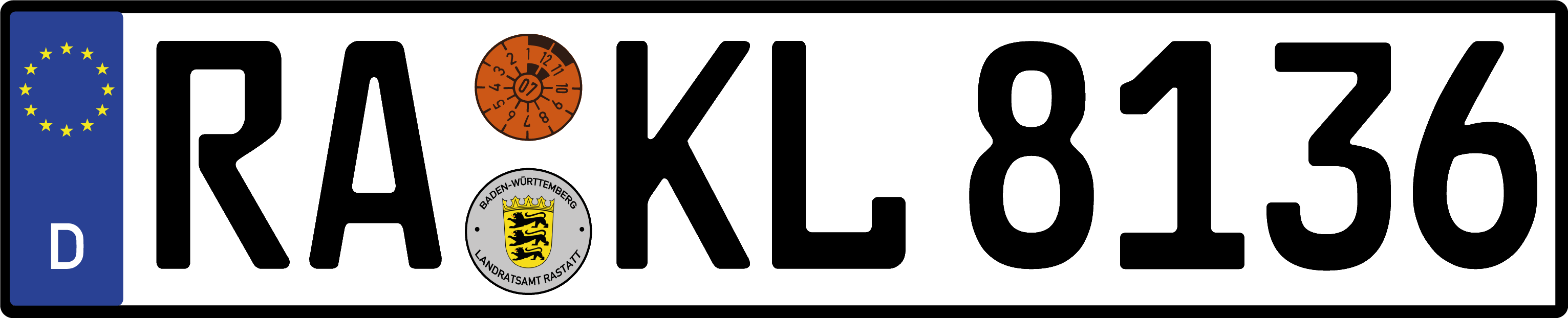
Germany (since 1994)

Akrotiri and Dhekelia (since 2014)

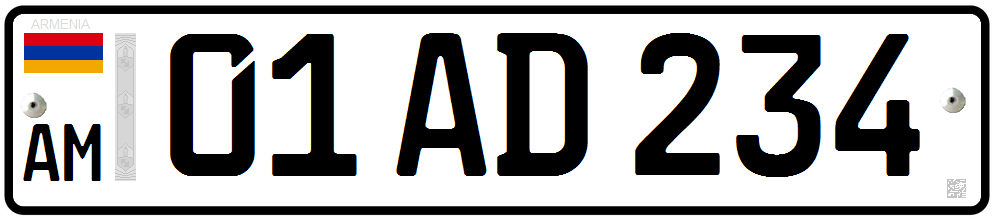
Armenia

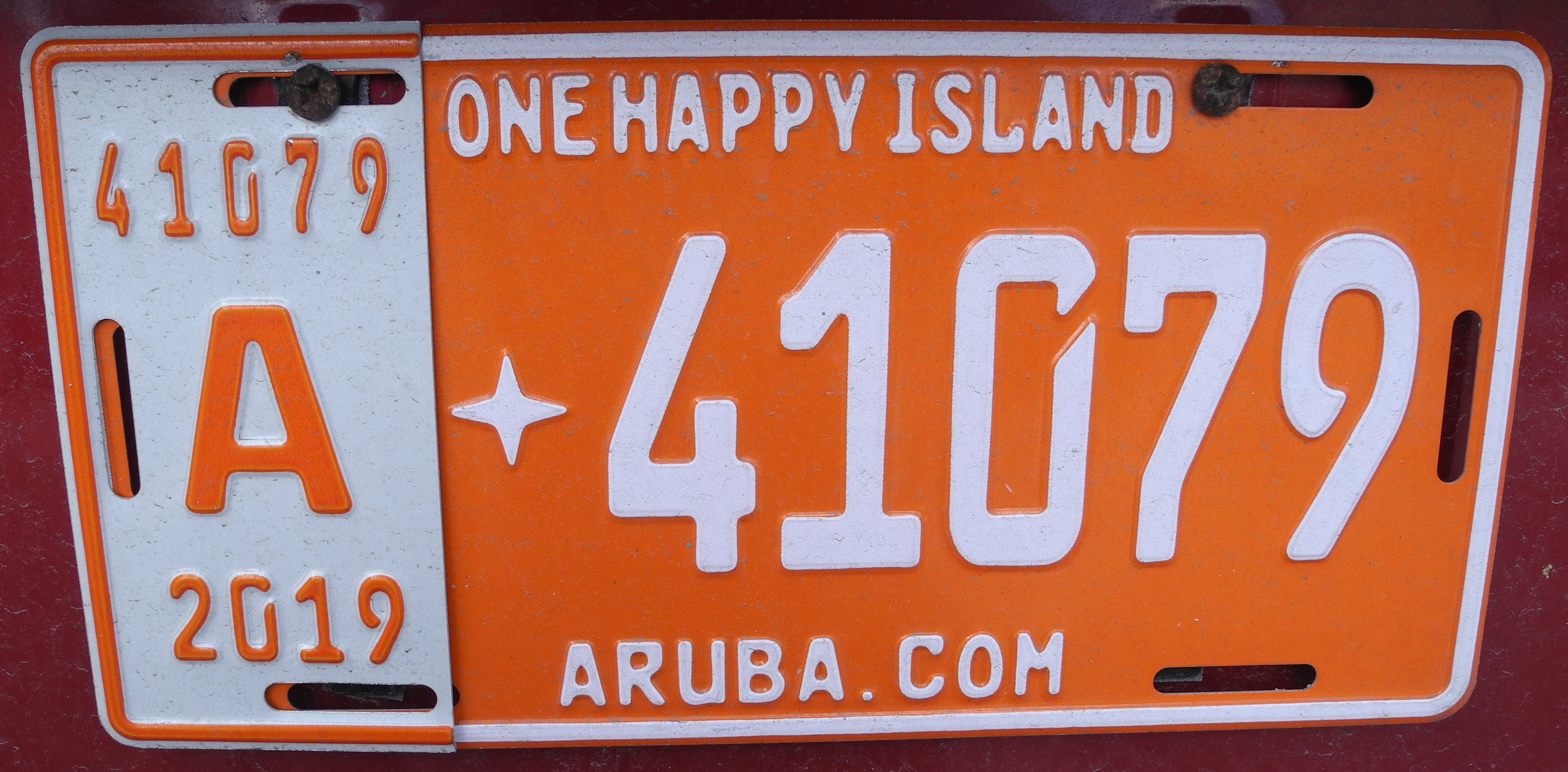
Aruba (since 2019)

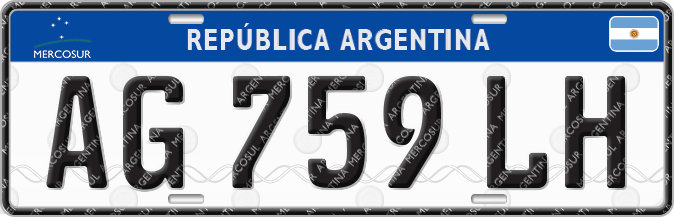
Argentina (since 2016)

Australia — Victoria (vanity plate)

Bolivia (since 2016)

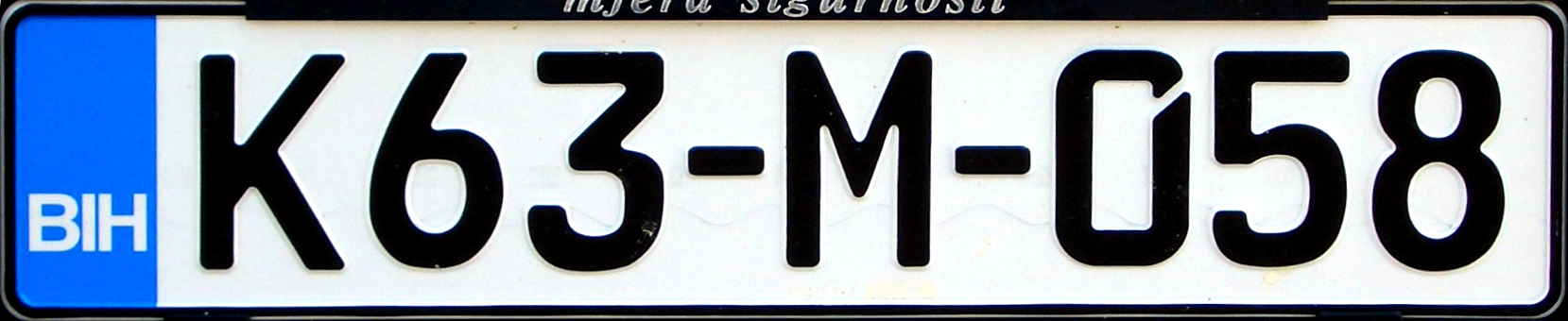
Bosnia and Herzegovina

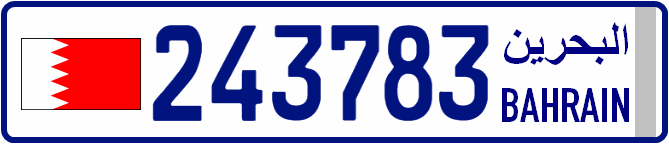
Bahrain

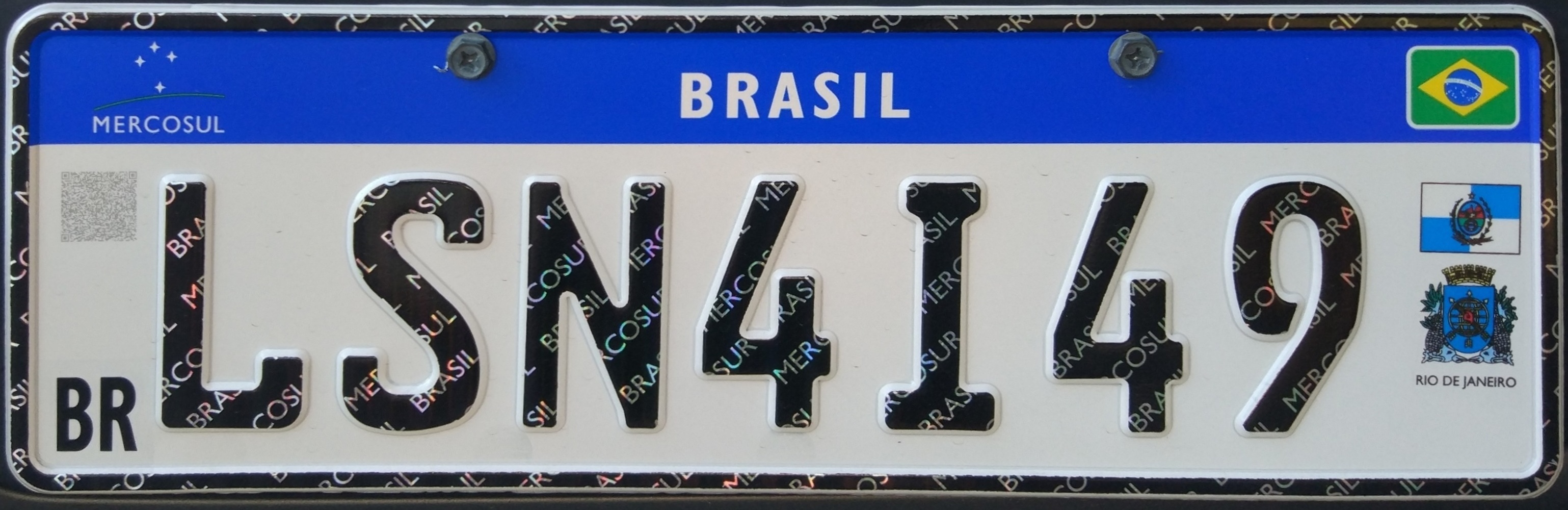
Brazil (since 2018)

Cyprus (since 2013)

Northern Cyprus (since 2018)

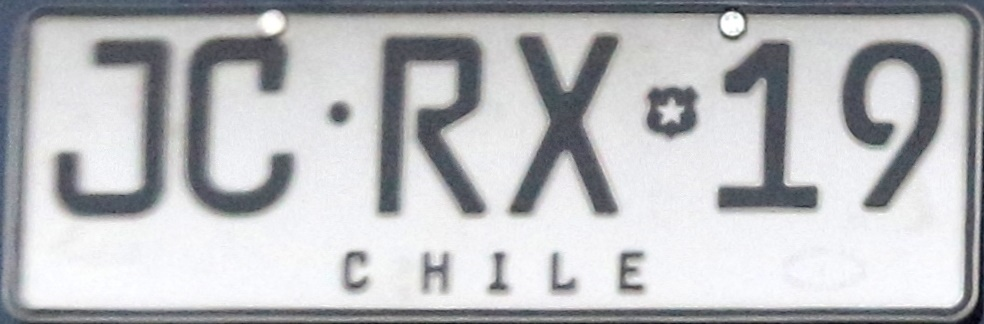
Chile (since 2014)

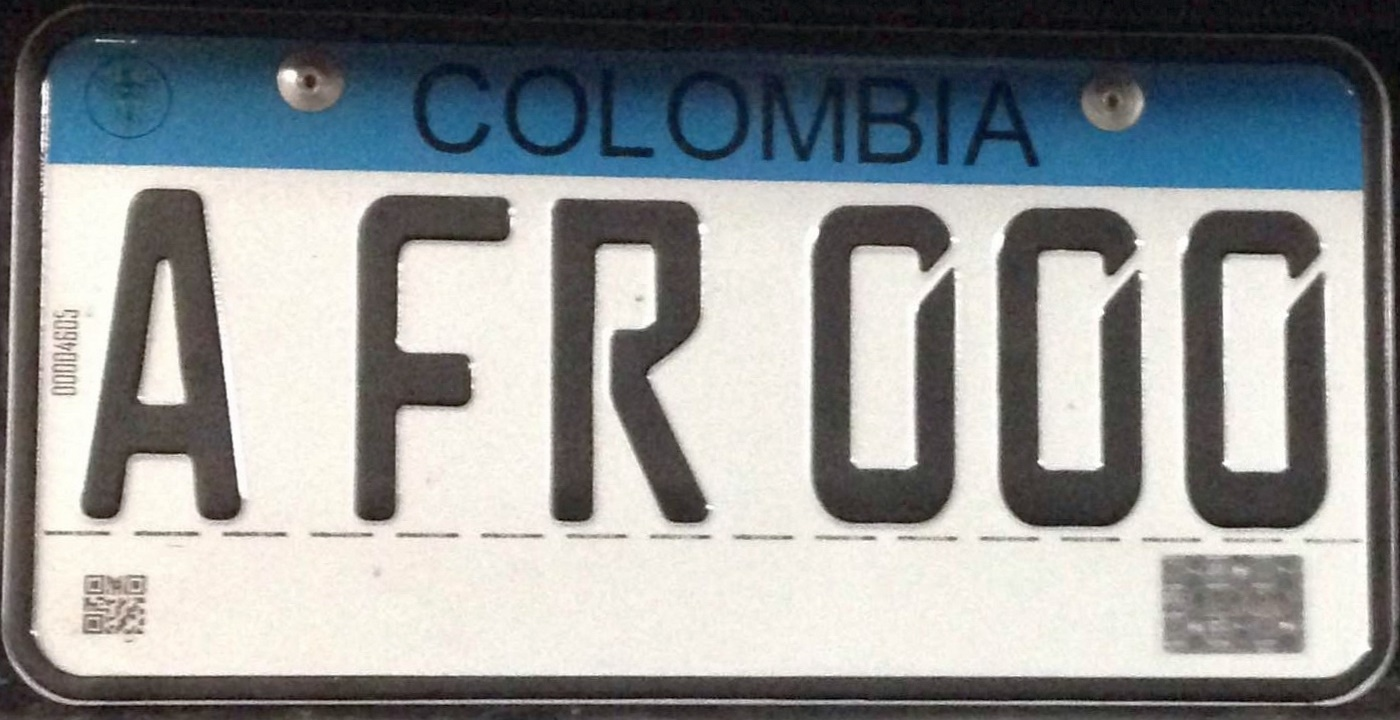
Colombia

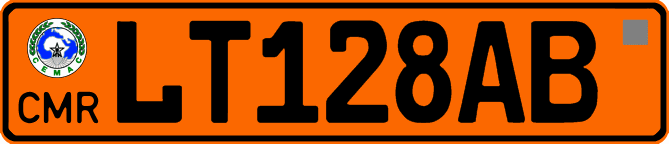
Cameroon

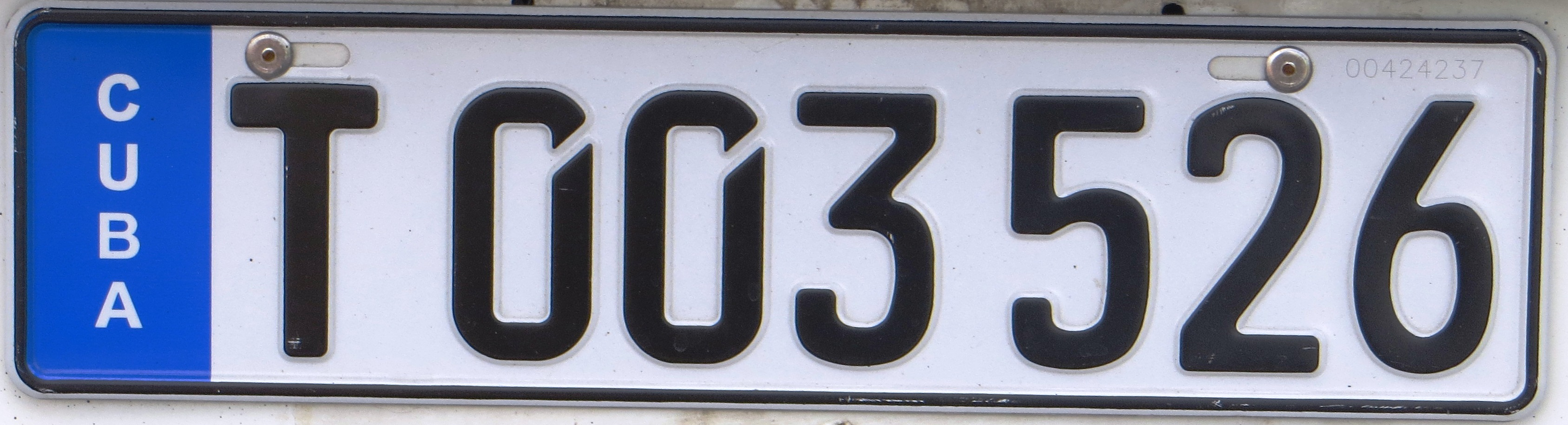
Cuba (since 2013)

Democratic Republic of Congo

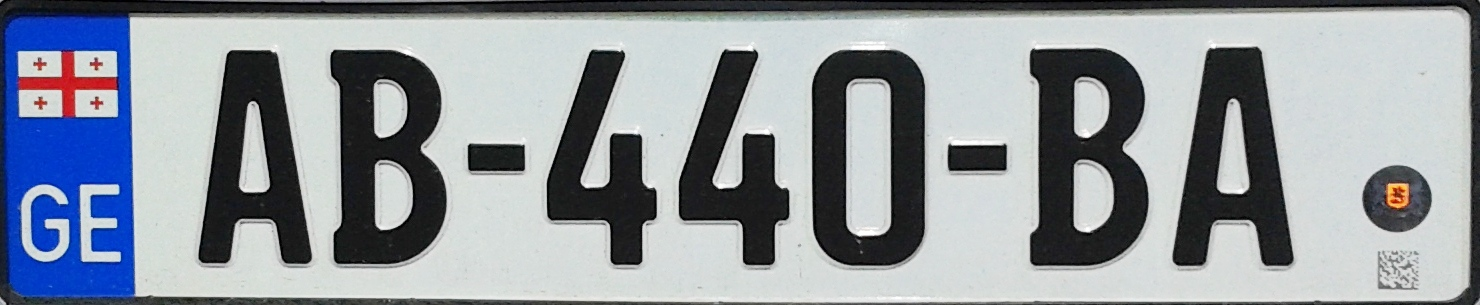
Georgia (since 2013)

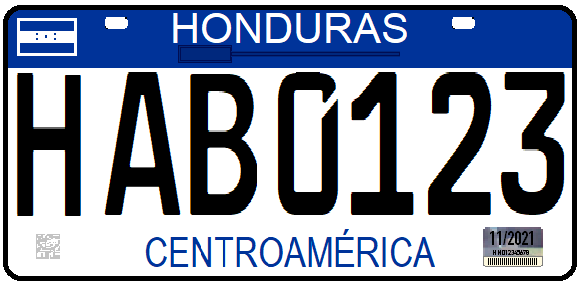
Honduras (since 2018)

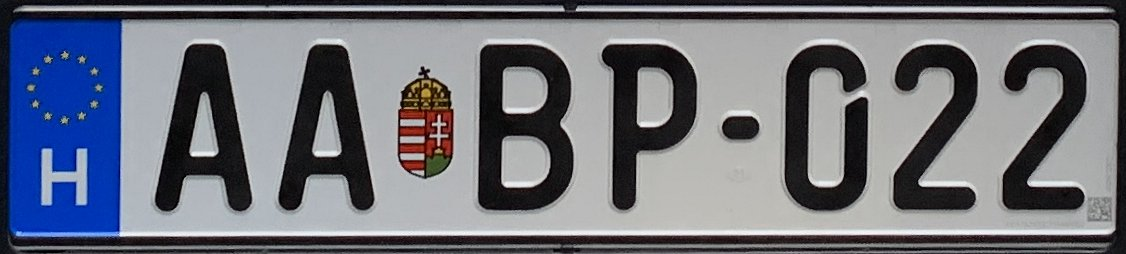
Hungary (since 2022)

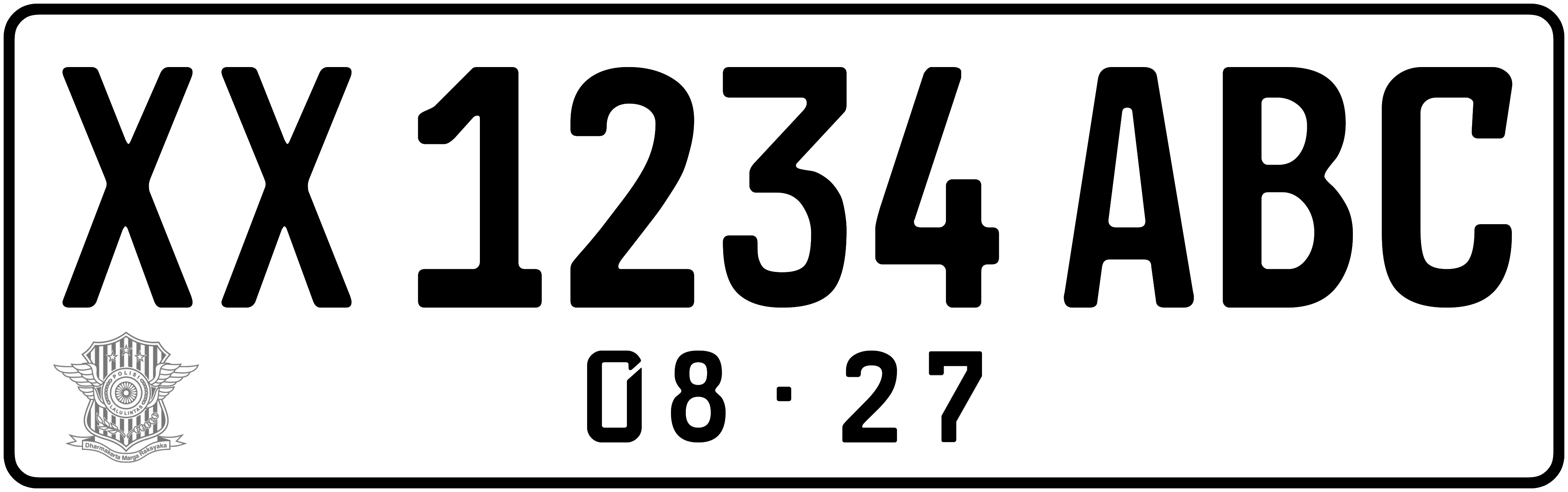
Indonesia (since 2022)

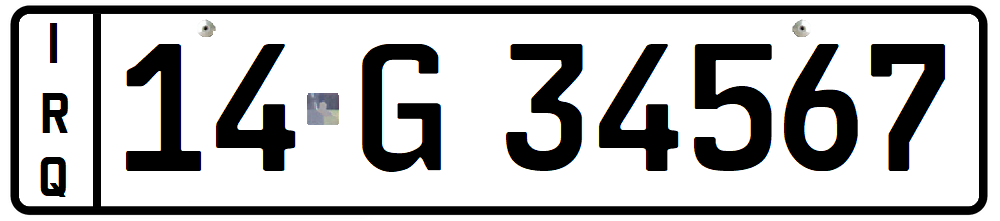
Iraq (since 2022)

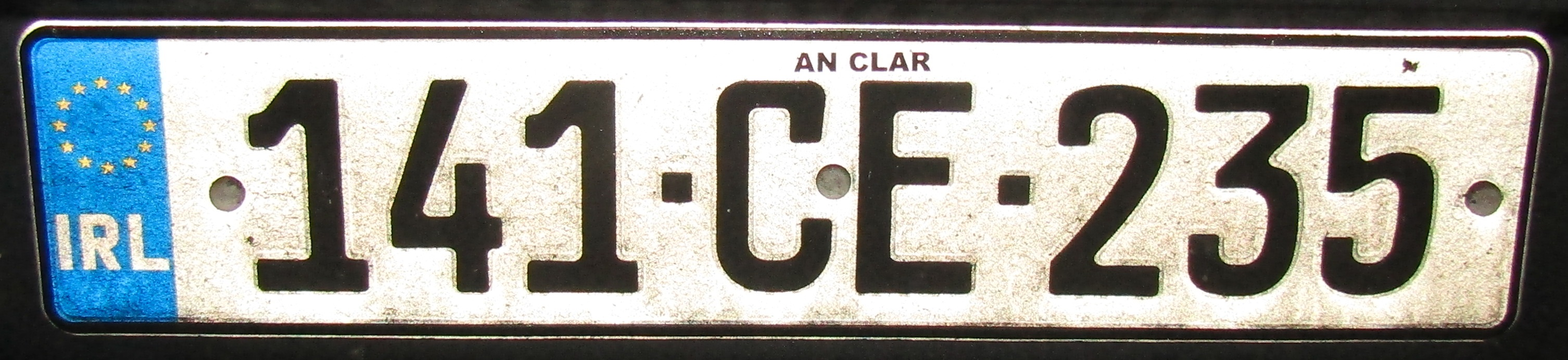
Ireland

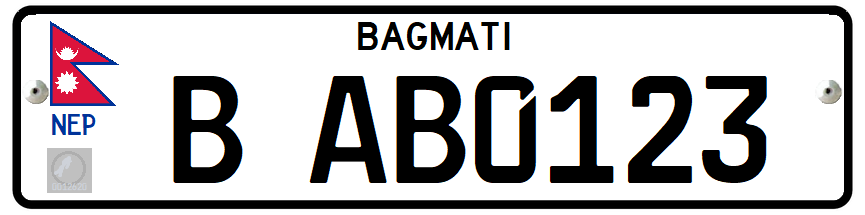
Nepal (since 2020)

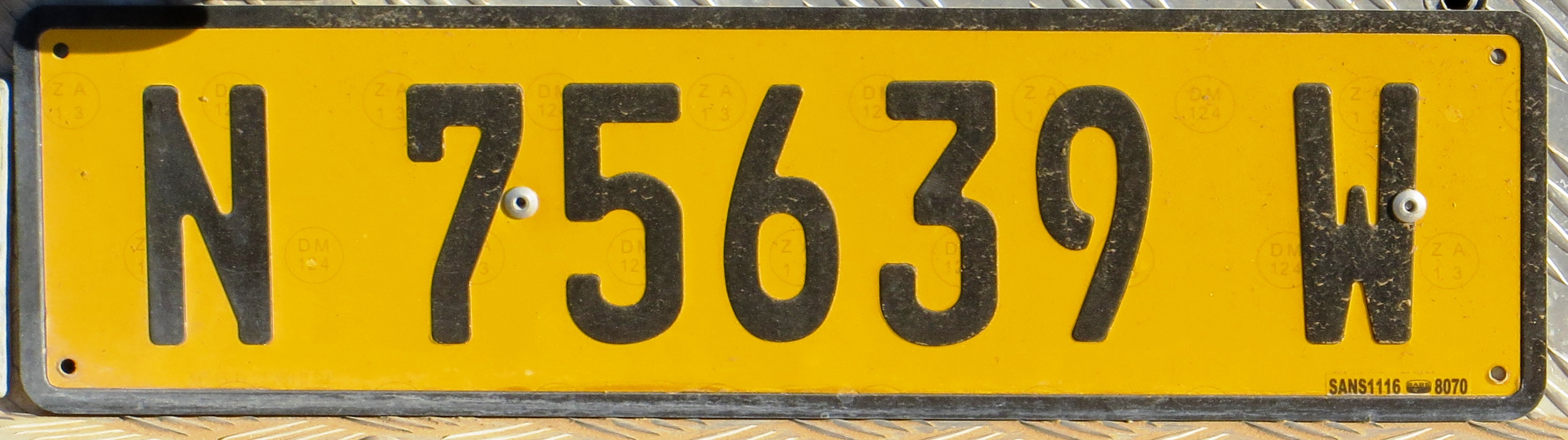
Namibia

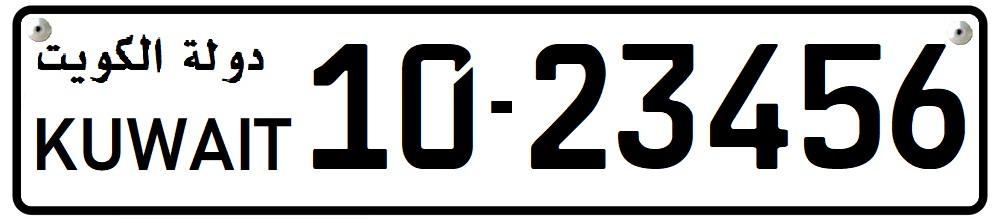
Kuwait

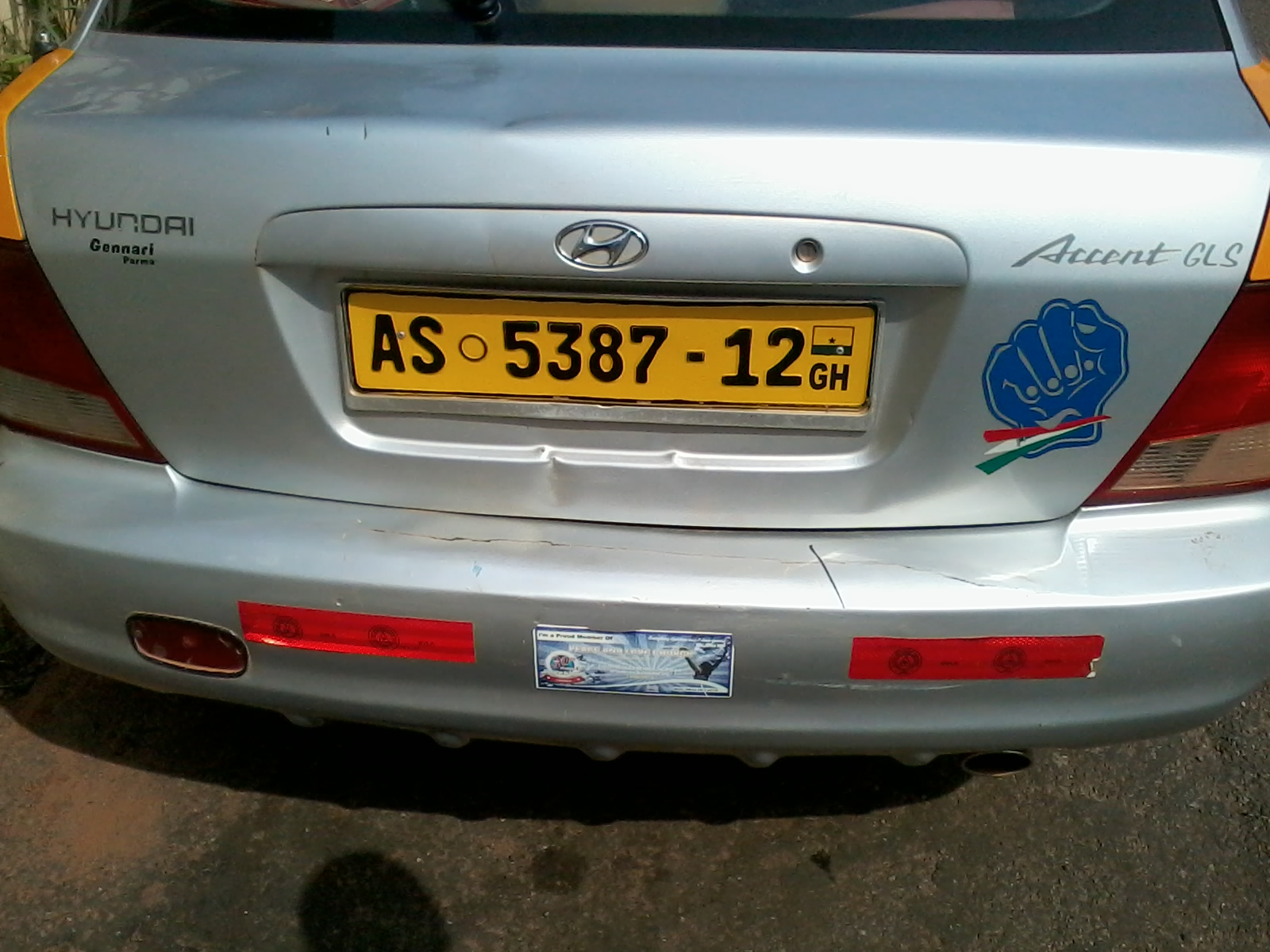
Ghana

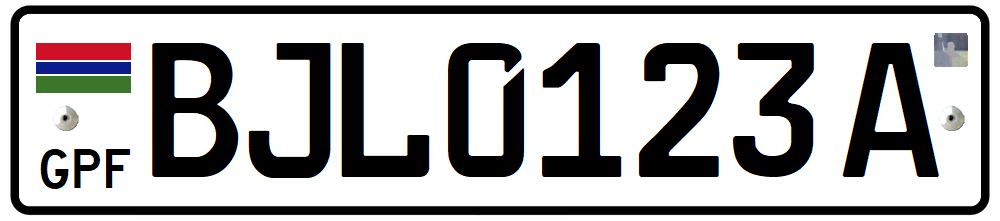
Gambia

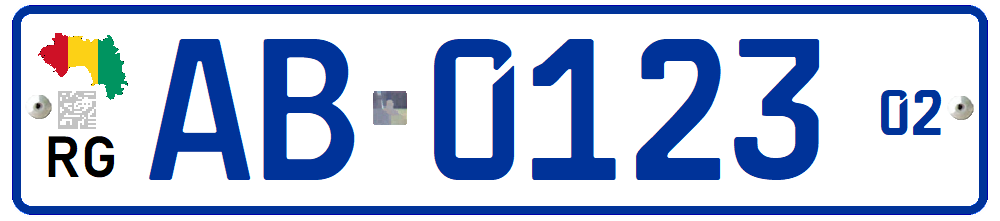
Guinea

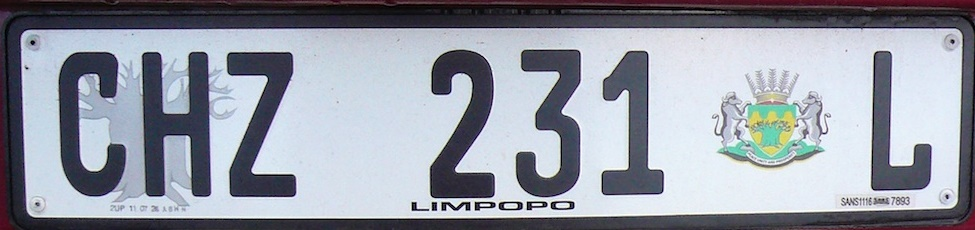
South Africa

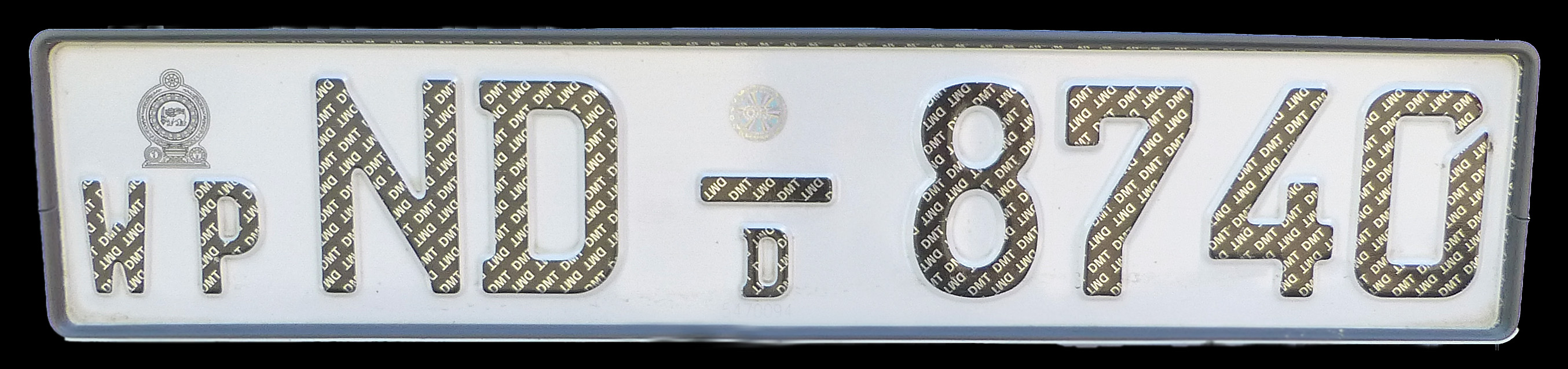
Sri Lanka

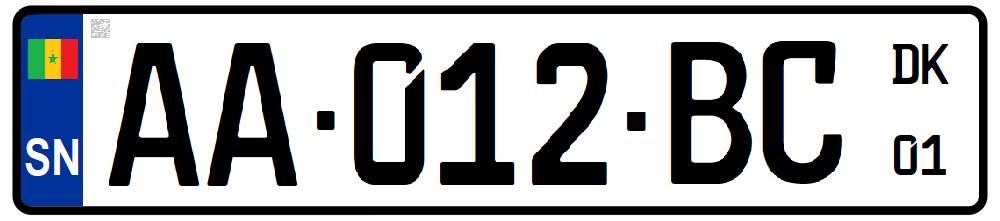
Senegal

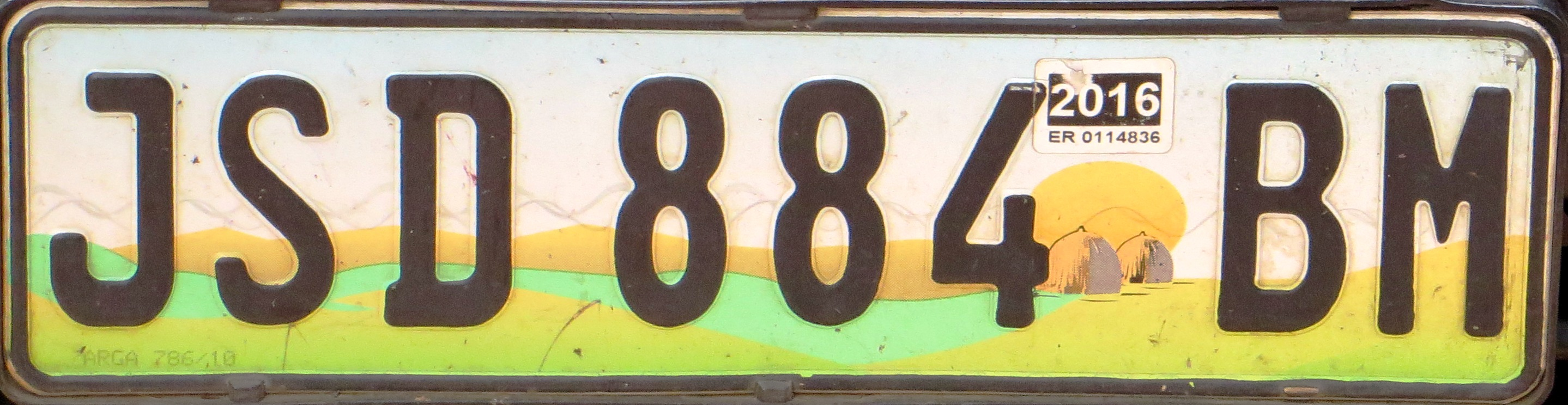
Swaziland

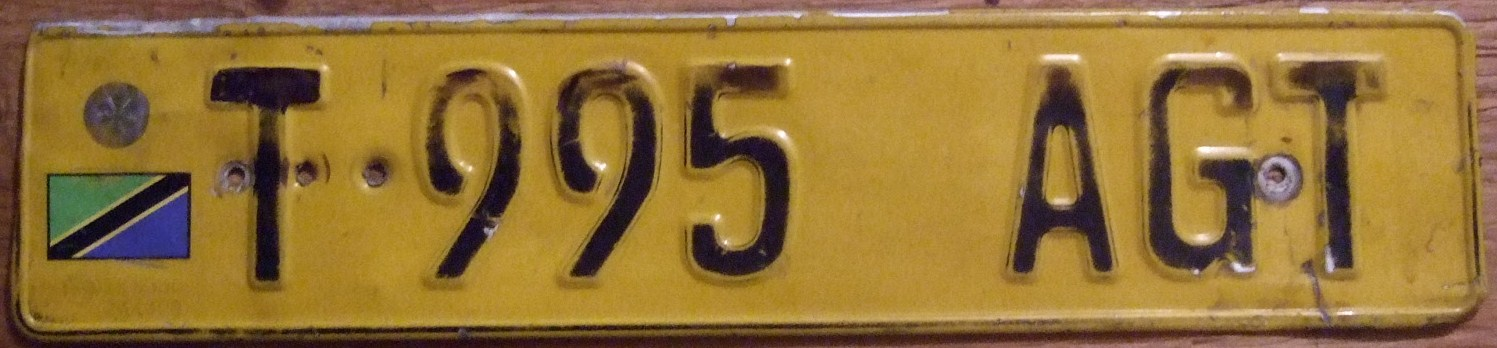
Tanzania

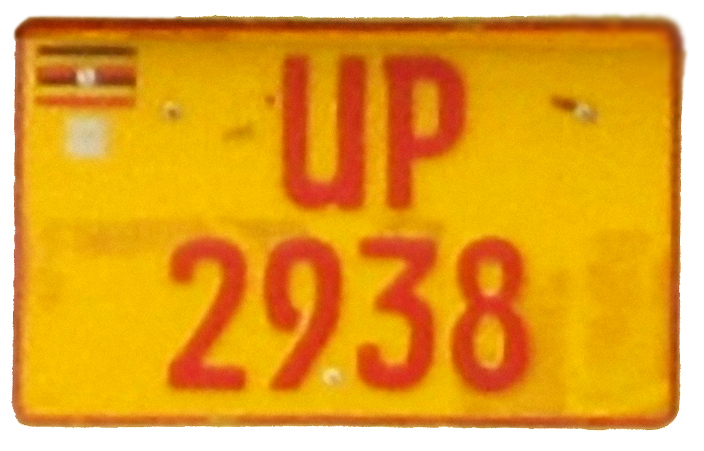
Uganda

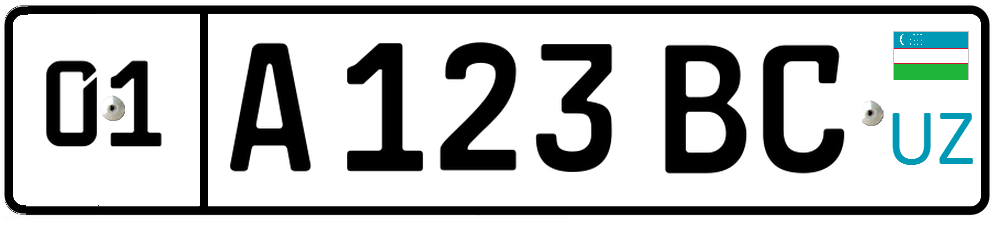
Uzbekistan

Uruguay

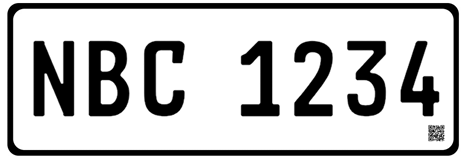
Philippines

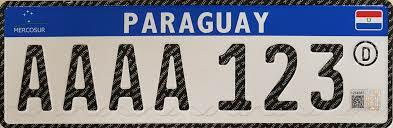
Paraguay (since 2019)

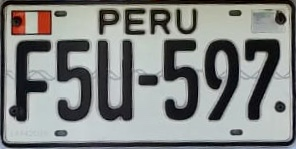
Peru (since 2010)

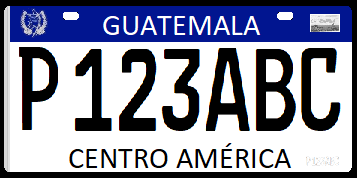
Guatemala (since 2020)

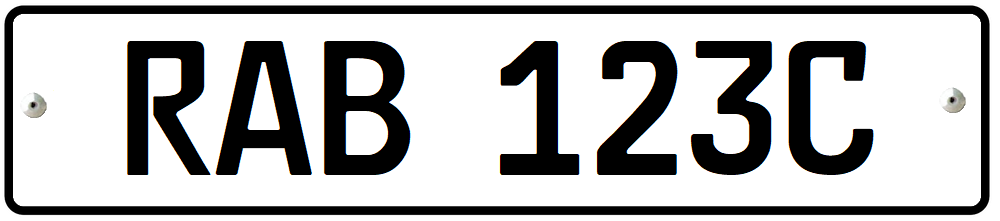
Rwanda

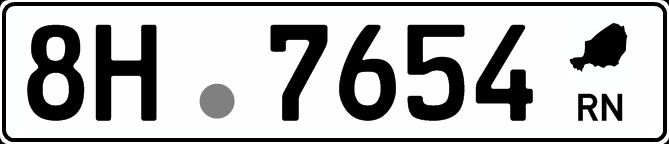
Niger

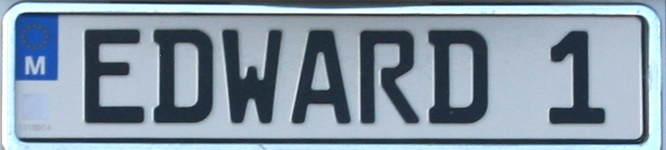
Malta

Moldova

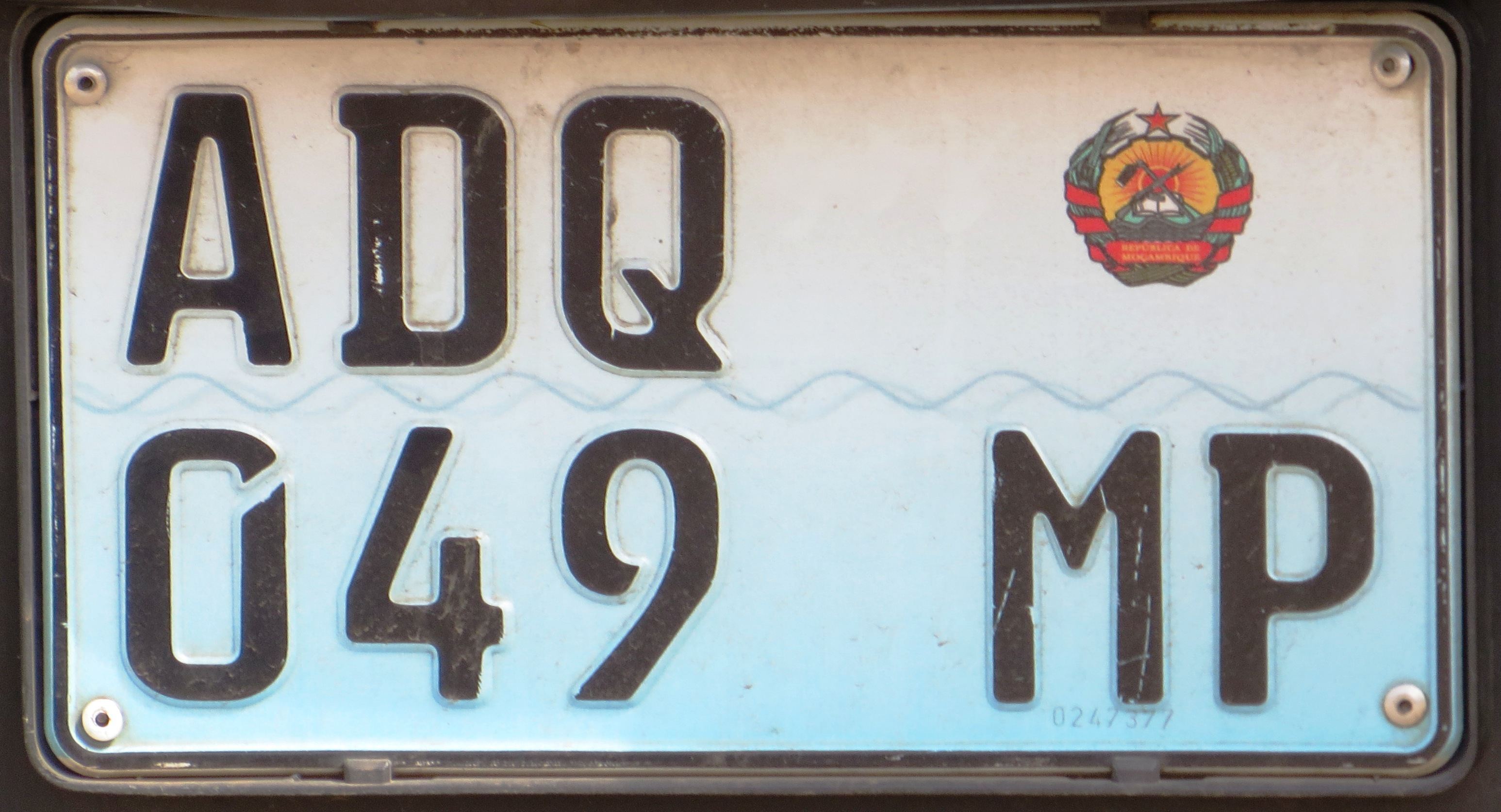
Mozambique

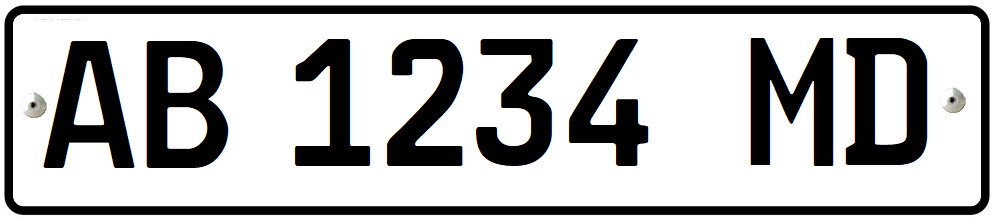
Mali

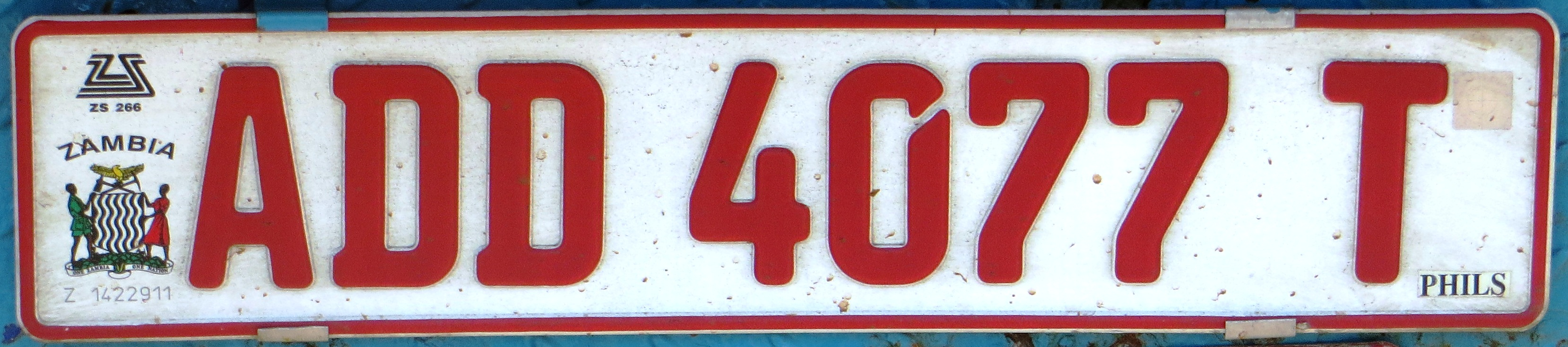
Zambia

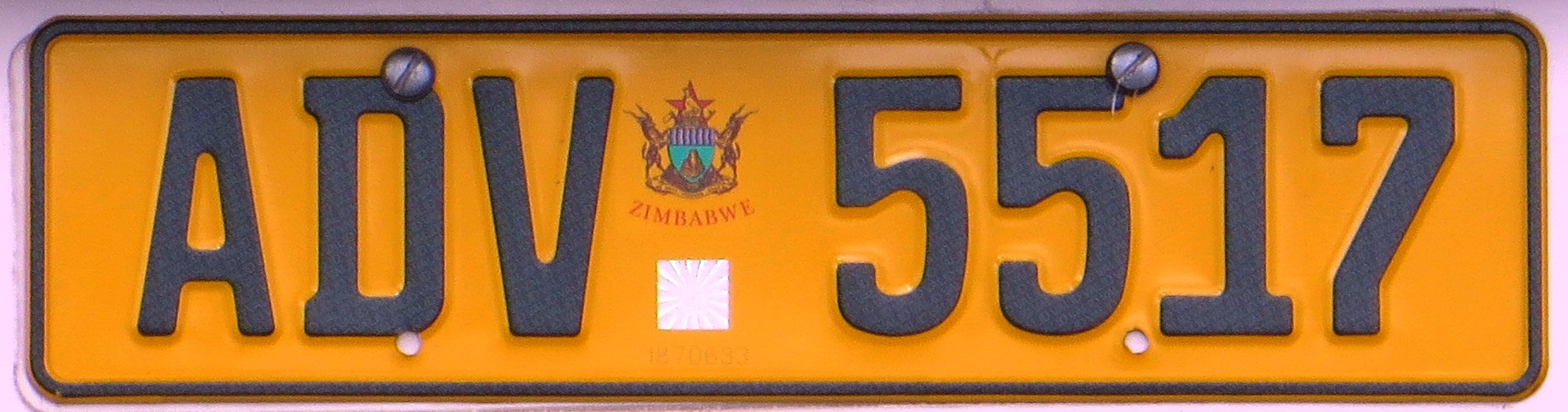
Zimbabwe

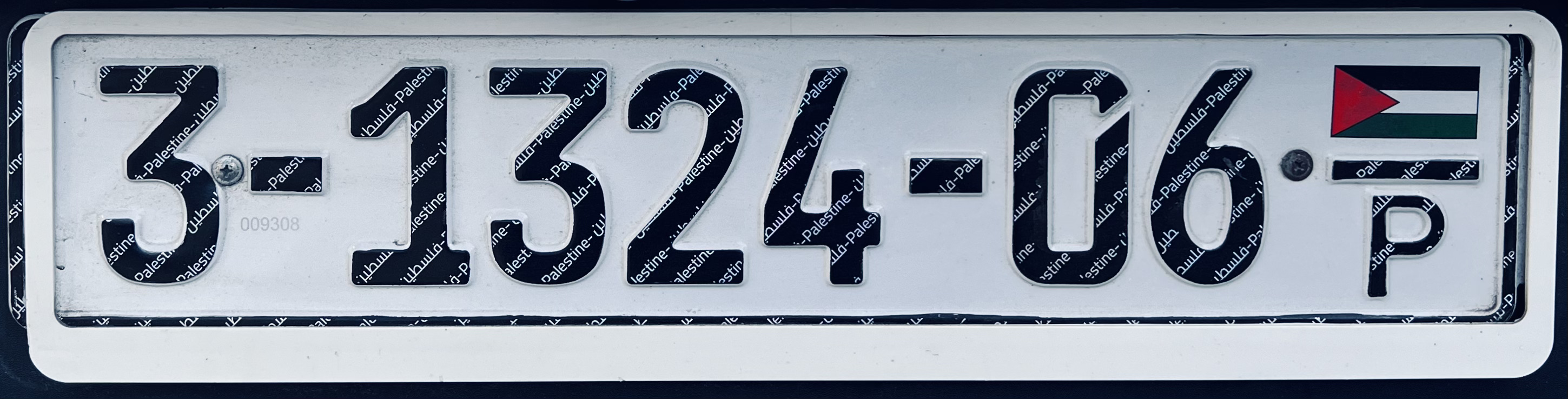
Gaza Strip (since 2021)

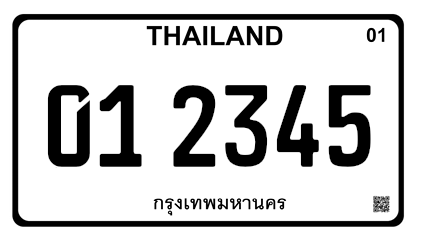
Thailand (since 2020)

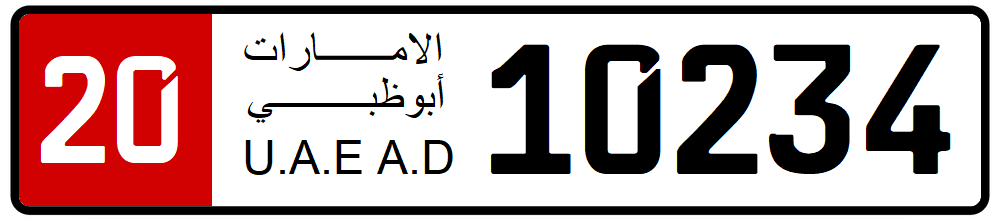
United Arab Emirates — Abu Dhabi

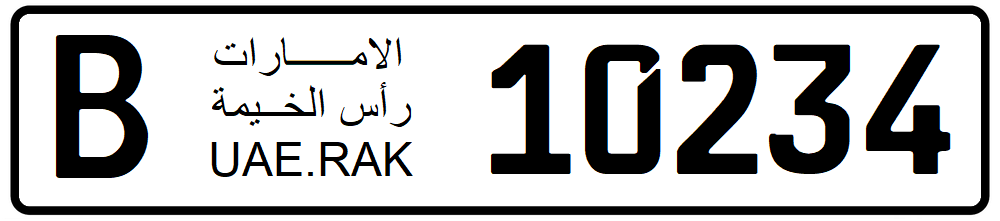
United Arab Emirates — Ras Al Khaimah

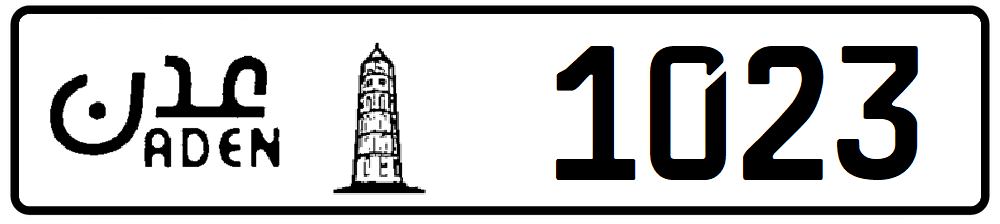
Yemen — Aden (EU model; 520 mm × 110 mm (20 in × 5 in))

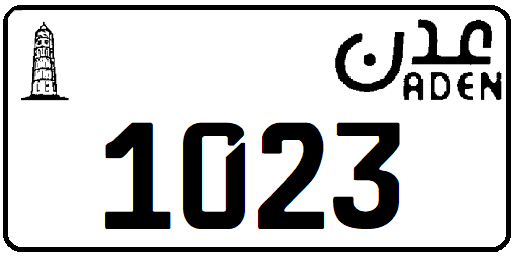
Yemen — Aden (US model; 335 mm × 170 mm (15 in × 5 in))

Malaysia (since 2024, for e-vehicles)

== See also ==
- Mandatory (typeface)
- Vehicle registration plates of Germany
