= Vehicle registration plates of Sri Lanka =

Democratic Socialist Republic of Sri Lanka
- Current regular legal (EU-sized) standard number plate Sri Lanka.
- Country: Sri Lanka
- Country code: CL

Current series
- Size: 520 mm × 110 mm 20.5 in × 4.3 in
- Colour (front): Black on White
- Colour (rear): Black on Yellow

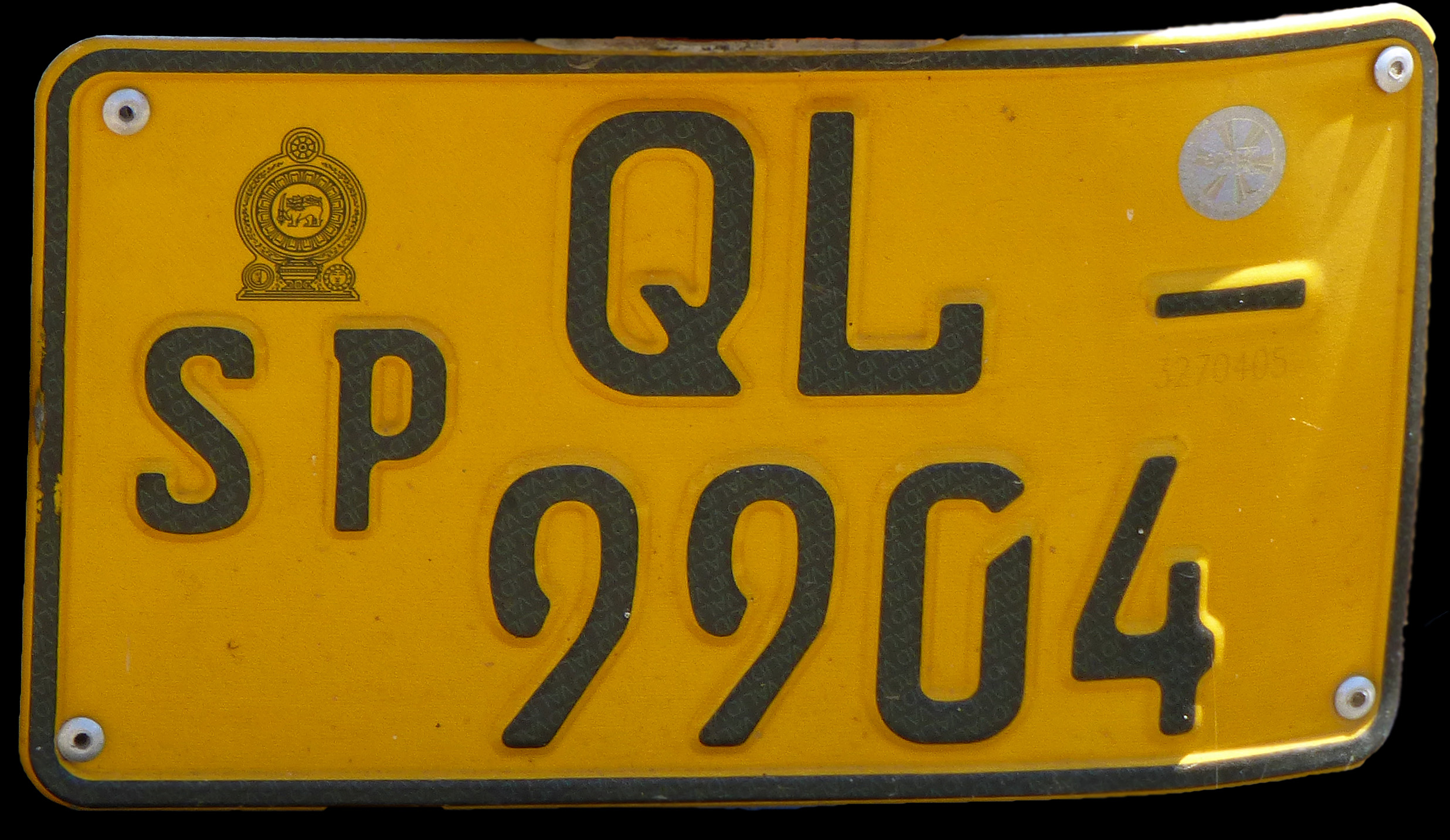
Sri Lankan license plate - Southern Province - rear side

Vehicle registration plates of Sri Lanka (known in Sri Lanka as "number plates") started soon after introduction of motorcars in 1903. Initially the numbers started with Q, and the oldest existing plate is "Q 53" of a 1903 Wolsley. Later the island was divided into sections from "A " to "Z" (Ex A 123 ), then after World War II it changed to the two Roman letter plates combining pairs of letters in the word CEYLON . These series were CL XXXX, EY XXXX, EL XXXx . Afterwards in 1956 a new system with the Sinhala script letter Sri (ශ්‍රී) in the middle was introduced, this started from Reg no "1 Sri 1".

The current version started in 2000. It is in the form of the country emblem and the two-letter region identifier below the emblem on the left side of the plate, two letters, four digits (serial format AB AB 1234). It was developed by the German Utsch AG using a variation of the FE-Schrift. As of 2013 a new system was introduced using 3 Latin letters and four digits, starting from “AAA 0001”.

The international vehicle registration code for Sri Lanka is CL.

== Regional Identifier Codes ==
The two-letter region identifier below the emblem stands for the Province the vehicle is registered in. The following list shows each one of them:

- Central Province: CP
- Eastern Province: EP
- North Central Province: NC
- Northern Province: NP
- North Western Province: NW
- Sabaragamuwa Province: SG
- Southern Province: SP
- Uva Province: UP
- Western Province: WP
