= Vehicle registration plates of Aruba =

Aruba, Kingdom of the Netherlands
- Country: Aruba (Netherlands)
- Country code: None

Current series
- Slogan: One Happy Island
- Size: 520 mm × 110 mm 20.5 in × 4.3 in
- Serial format: A 1234

Aruba requires its residents to register their motor vehicles and display vehicle registration plates. The island is one of the last jurisdictions in the world to continue issuing new plates each year rather than showing re-validation through stickers or other documentation.

The license plates have been changed annually since 1950. Only until 1958 the name "ARUBA N.A." was displayed on it. In 1976 the slogan "ISLA DI CARNAVAL" (English :"Island of Carnaval") was added. The slogan was changed again in 1983 to display "ONE HAPPY ISLAND". When Aruba became its own autonomous country within the Kingdom of the Netherlands in 1986, the name "ARUBA N.A." was changed to "ARUBA". Since 2011 the word "ARUBA" was changed to "aruba.com". The plate itself is valid for the first half of the year, and then a metal tab is added to indicate validity during the second half of the year. This tab is painted in the reverse color scheme as the plate and displays the same serial number as the plate.

From 2019 onwards the FE-Schrift or Fälschungserschwerende Schrift is used as the font for all vehicle registration plates of Aruba. Following this change in the font, the name "aruba.com" will be changed to "ARUBA.COM" in all capitals. This is the first time since 1993 that the license plates have undergone a drastic change in the use of its font.

The Governor of Aruba as representative of the Dutch Monarch uses the "A" Prefix with Number "1" (A-1) as his plate.

== 1931 to 1957 ==
While license plates in Aruba may have been issued as early as 1924, few of these plates are known to exist. All plates issued through 1957 appear to have been 14 centimetres (5.5 in) in height by 36 centimetres (14 in) in width.

Image	Year	Plate colors	Slogan	Serial Format	Serials Issued	Notes
1234-A	1931	pink on green	none	1234-A		
A-1234	1932	white on dark blue	none	A-1234		
1234-A	1933	black on white	none	1234-A		
A-1234	1934	yellow on black	none	A-1234		
A-1234	1935	white on blue	none	1234-A		
A-1234	1936	red on white	none	A-1234		
1234-A	1937	white on black	none	1234-A		
A-1234	1938	black on orange	none	A-1234		
1234-A	1939	white on dark blue	none	1234-A		
A-1234	1940	black on white	none	A-1234		
1234-A	1941	yellow on black	none	1234-A		
A-1234	1942	black on white	none	A-1234		
	1943		none	1234-A		
A-1234	1944	white on blue	none	A-1234		
1234-A	1945	black on white	none	1234-A		
	1946		none	A-1234		
A-1234	1947	yellow on black	none	A-1234		
1234-A	1948	black on white	none	1234-A		
A-1234	1949	orange on black	none	A-1234		
1234-A	1950	black on golden yellow	none	1234-A		
A-1234	1951	white on black	none	A-1234		
1234-A	1952	black on white	none	1234-A		
A-1234	1953	golden yellow on black	none	A-1234		
A-1234	1954	black on golden yellow	none	A-1234		
A-1234	1955	golden yellow on black	none	A-1234		
A-1234	1956	black on orange	none	A-1234		
A-1234	1957	golden yellow on black	none	A-1234		

== 1958 to 1975 ==
In 1958 Aruba changed their license plate size to the North American standard plate size of 152 × 300 mm (6 × 12 inches). At the same time the words "ARUBA N.A." appeared at the top of the plate. Prior to 1958 the country name had not appeared on the plates. The long bolt slots introduced in 1960 allowed the use of 1/2 year validation tabs. Whether these tabs were issued from 1960 to 1963 is not known, but tabs for 1964 and all years since are known to exist.

Image	Year	Plate colors	Slogan	Serial Format	Serials Issued	Notes
A-1234	1958	black on orange	none	A-1234		
A-1234	1959	golden yellow on black	none	A-1234		
A-1234	1960	white on blue	none	A-1234		Plates modified with long bolt slots to accommodate 1/2 year validation tabs.
A-1234	1961	black on golden yellow	none	A-1234		
A-1234	1962	black on white	none	A-1234		
A-1234	1963	white on red	none	A-1234		
A-1234	1964	red on white	none	A-1234		
A-1234	1965	black on golden yellow	none	A-1234		
	1966	white on royal blue	none	A-1234		
	1967	golden yellow on black	none	A-1234		
A-1234	1968	white on maroon	none	A-1234		
	1969	maroon on white	none	A-12345		Longer serial format starting this year is based on earliest known 5-digit plate.
	1970	green on white	none	A-12345		
A-12345	1971	white on maroon	none	A-12345		
	1972	black on orange	none	A-12345		
A-12345	1973	blue on white	none	A-12345		
A-12345	1974	white on maroon	none	A-12345		
	1975	white on blue	none	A-12345		

== 1976 to 2003 ==
In 1976 new license plates were introduced with the slogan "ISLA DI CARNIVAL" centered at the bottom. The year was simultaneously re-positioned vertically at the far right into two sets of numbers separated by a bolt hole. The slogan was changed again in 1983 to "ONE HAPPY ISLAND". After Aruba became a separate autonomous country within the Kingdom of the Netherlands in 1986, the N.A. in ″Aruba, N.A.″ (N.A. standing for Netherlands Antilles) was removed.

Image	Year	Plate colors	Slogan	Serial Format	Serials Issued	Notes
	1976	black on off-white	ISLA DI CARNIVAL	A-12345		
	1977	red on golden yellow	ISLA DI CARNIVAL	A-12345		
	1978	golden yellow on red	ISLA DI CARNIVAL	A-12345		
	1979	red on white	ISLA DI CARNIVAL	A-12345		
	1980	white on brown	ISLA DI CARNIVAL	A-12345		
	1981	black on yellow	ISLA DI CARNIVAL	A-12345		Last year for wide dies for serial number.
	1982	red on white	ISLA DI CARNIVAL	A-12345		New thinner style font for serial number introduced.
	1983	yellow on light blue	ONE HAPPY ISLAND	A-12345		First year for new slogan.
	1984	black on yellow	ONE HAPPY ISLAND	A-12345		Very thin style font introduced for serial numbers.
	1985	black on white	ONE HAPPY ISLAND	A-12345		
	1986	red on yellow	ONE HAPPY ISLAND	A-12345		Last year for "Aruba N.A." at top of plate.
	1987	white on mauve	ONE HAPPY ISLAND	A-12345		
	1988	black on white	ONE HAPPY ISLAND	A-12345		
	1989	white on red	ONE HAPPY ISLAND	A-12345		
	1990	white on blue	ONE HAPPY ISLAND	A-12345		
	1991	white on black	ONE HAPPY ISLAND	A-12345		
	1992	black on white	ONE HAPPY ISLAND	A-12345		
	1993	white on brown	ONE HAPPY ISLAND	A-12345		
	1994	white on blue	ONE HAPPY ISLAND	A-12345		
	1995	black on red	ONE HAPPY ISLAND	A-12345		
	1996	blue on white	ONE HAPPY ISLAND	A-12345		
	1997	white on pine green	ONE HAPPY ISLAND	A-12345		
	1998	black on white	ONE HAPPY ISLAND	A-12345		
	1999	white on orange	ONE HAPPY ISLAND	A-12345		
	2000	brown on white	ONE HAPPY ISLAND	A-12345		
	2001	black on yellow	ONE HAPPY ISLAND	A-12345		
	2002	white on black	ONE HAPPY ISLAND	A-12345		
	2003	black on orange	ONE HAPPY ISLAND	A-12345		

== 2004 to present ==
In 2004 the year of the license plate was moved to the left side, and it became hidden behind the semi-annual validation tab when the tab was placed onto the plate. This change allows the serial number to be moved farther to the right when five digit plates are used. Between 2015 and 2019, the four-pointed star seen on the flag of Aruba was also added to the design.

Image	Year	Plate colors	Slogan	Serial Format	Serials Issued	Notes
	2004	yellow on black	ONE HAPPY ISLAND	A-12345		
	2005	white on blue	ONE HAPPY ISLAND	A-12345		
	2006	white on red	ONE HAPPY ISLAND	A-12345		
	2007	black on white	ONE HAPPY ISLAND	A-12345		
	2008	white on green	ONE HAPPY ISLAND	A-12345		
	2009	black on yellow	ONE HAPPY ISLAND	A-12345		
	2010	white on blue	ONE HAPPY ISLAND	A-12345		
	2011	white on red	ONE HAPPY ISLAND	A-12345		
A-12345	2012	brown on white	ONE HAPPY ISLAND	A-12345		
A-12345	2013	white on orange	ONE HAPPY ISLAND	A-12345		
A-12345	2014	black on white	ONE HAPPY ISLAND	A-12345		
A-12345	2015	white on blue	ONE HAPPY ISLAND	A-12345		
	2019	white on orange	ONE HAPPY ISLAND			
A-12345	2020	maroon on white	ONE HAPPY ISLAND	A-12345		

== Type codes ==
The codes in the chart below are currently displayed as the first character in the serial number and identify the type of vehicle the license plate is registered to.

Prefix	Type	Prefix	Type
A	Private automobile	MFA	Motorcycle A
AG	Agent	MFD	Motorcycle D
B	Bus	MFV	Motorcycle V
BR	Company car	N	Vanity plate
D	Government vehicle	O	Non-scheduled transport
DT	Diesel Truck	T	Touring
GAR	Garage	TR	Truck
MBA	Private motorboat	TX	Taxi
MBD	Pilot boat	V	Rental car
