= Vehicle registration plates of Mali =

Mali
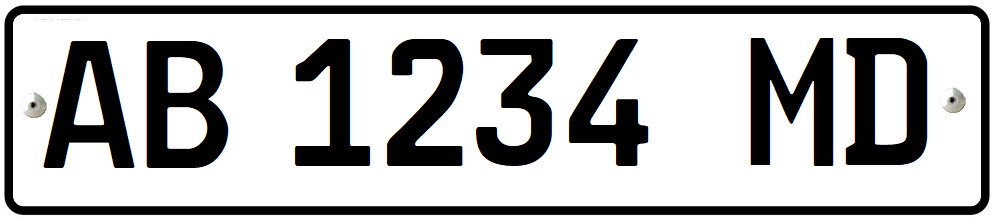
- Malian regular legal standard number plate.
- Country: Mali
- Country code: RMM (unofficially using ML since 2024)

Current series
- Size: 520 mm × 110 mm 20.5 in × 4.3 in
- Serial format: Not standard
- Colour (front): Black on white
- Colour (rear): Black on white

Mali requires its residents to register their motor vehicles and display vehicle registration plates. Current plates are European standard 520 mm × 110 mm, and use FE-Schrift. The international vehicle registration code for Mali is RMM.

Image	First issued	Design	Slogan	Serial format	Serials issued	Notes
				XX #### XX		
