= Vehicle registration plates of Zambia =

Zambia
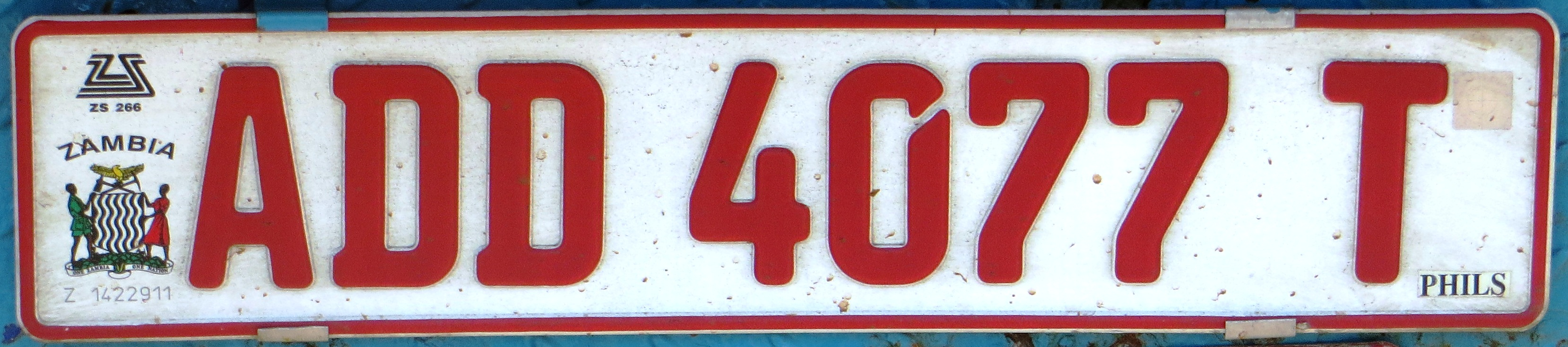
- Zambian regular legal standard number plate.
- Country: Zambia
- Country code: Z? ZM? RNR?

Current series
- Size: 520 mm × 110 mm 20.5 in × 4.3 in

Zambia requires its residents to register their motor vehicles and display vehicle registration plates. Current plates are European standard 520 mm × 110 mm, and use FE-Schrift.

Image	First issued	Design	Slogan	Serial format	Serials issued	Notes
