= Vehicle registration plates of Djibouti =

Republic of Djibouti
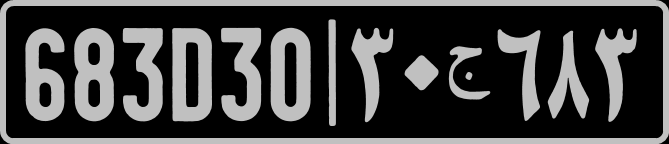
- Pre-2023 regular legal standard number plate from Djibouti
- Country: Djibouti
- Country code: None

Current series
- Size: 520 mm × 110 mm 20.5 in × 4.3 in
- Serial format: Not standard
- Colour (front): White-on-black (black-on-white until 2023)
- Colour (rear): White-on-black (black-on-white until 2023)

Djibouti requires its residents to register their motor vehicles and display vehicle registration plates. The current version started in 2023 are European standard (520 mm × 110 mm (20 in × 5 in)); black texts on white background; used FE-Schrift typeface for alphanumeric and Square Kufic typeface for Arabic text.

Image	First issued	Design	Slogan	Serial format	Serials issued	Notes
