= Vehicle registration plates of Tanzania =

United Republic of Tanzania
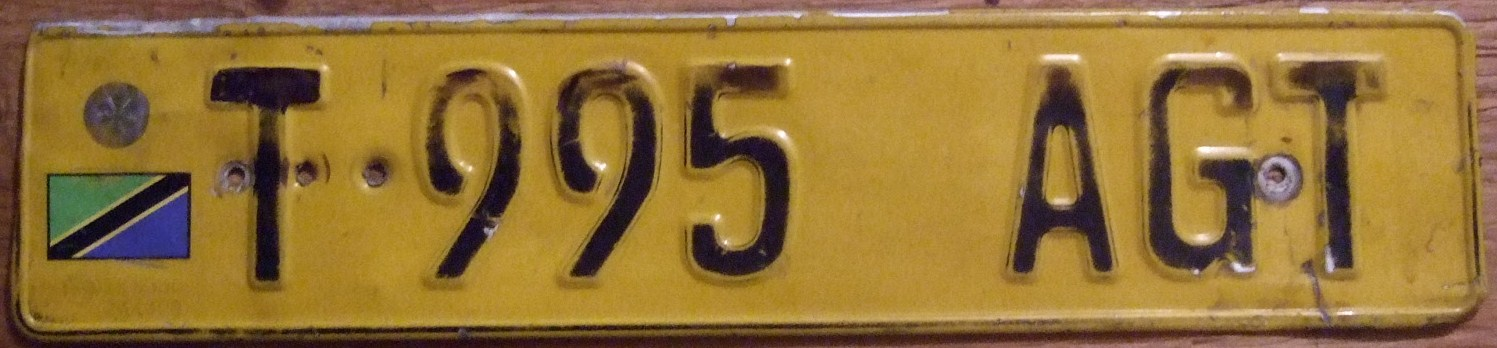
- Tanzanian regular legal standard number plate (two-row).
- Country: Tanzania
- Country code: EAT

Current series
- Size: 520 mm × 110 mm 20.5 in × 4.3 in
- Serial format: T 123ABC
- Colour (front): white
- Colour (rear): Black on yellow

Number plates of z 258 jn Tanzania date back to at least 1933 in Tanganyika and to the 1950s in Zanzibar. They are the same size as their British counterparts and used the same font until the late 1980s. Mainland Tanzania and Zanzibar use slightly different formats.

== 1933 ==
In 1933, Tanganyika used white-on-black plates. Letters denoted the city (DS for Dar es Salaam) and was followed by four numbers.

XX 9999	XX 9999

== 1980s ==
British standard plates were still being used in the 1980s. Tanzania used yellow plates (front and back) for private cars, while white plates were used on busses, taxis and hire cars. All plates began with a 'T', followed by two letters and four numbers.

TXX 9999	TXX 9999
TXX 9999	TXX 9999

== 1990s ==
In the 1990s, the font was changed to one resembling the FE-Schrift of German plates. The preceding 'T' was replaced by other letters and the number of digits reduced to three.

XXX 9999	XXX 9999
XXX 9999	XXX 9999

== 2006 ==
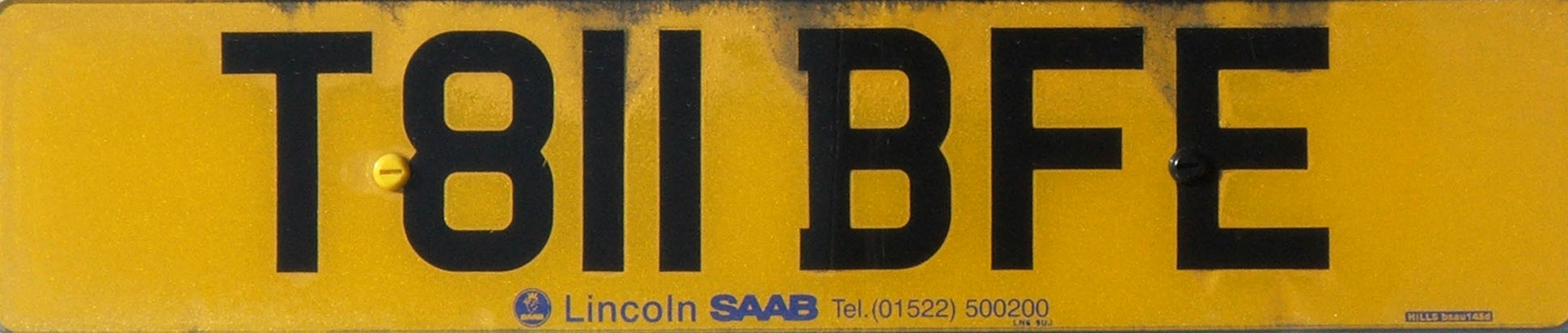
UK style plate

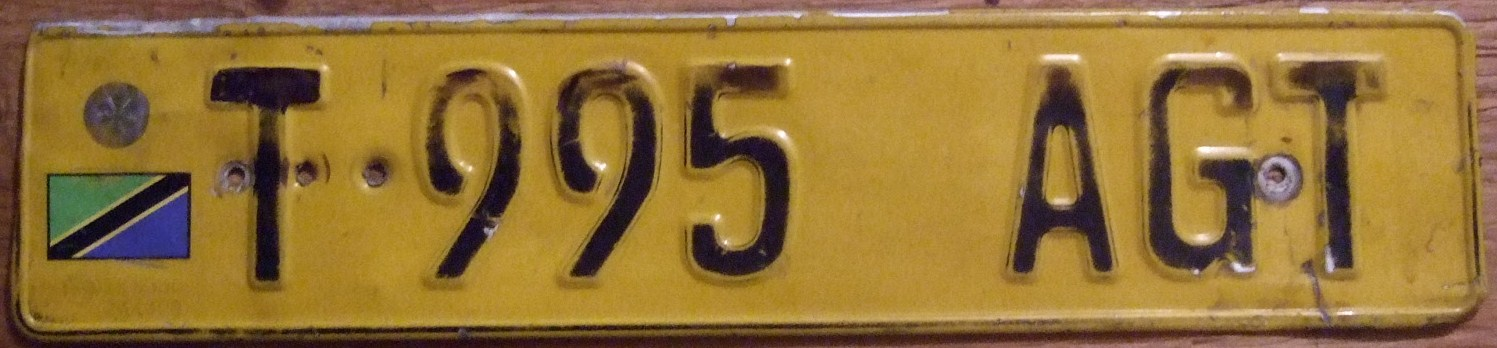
Private plate from 2009

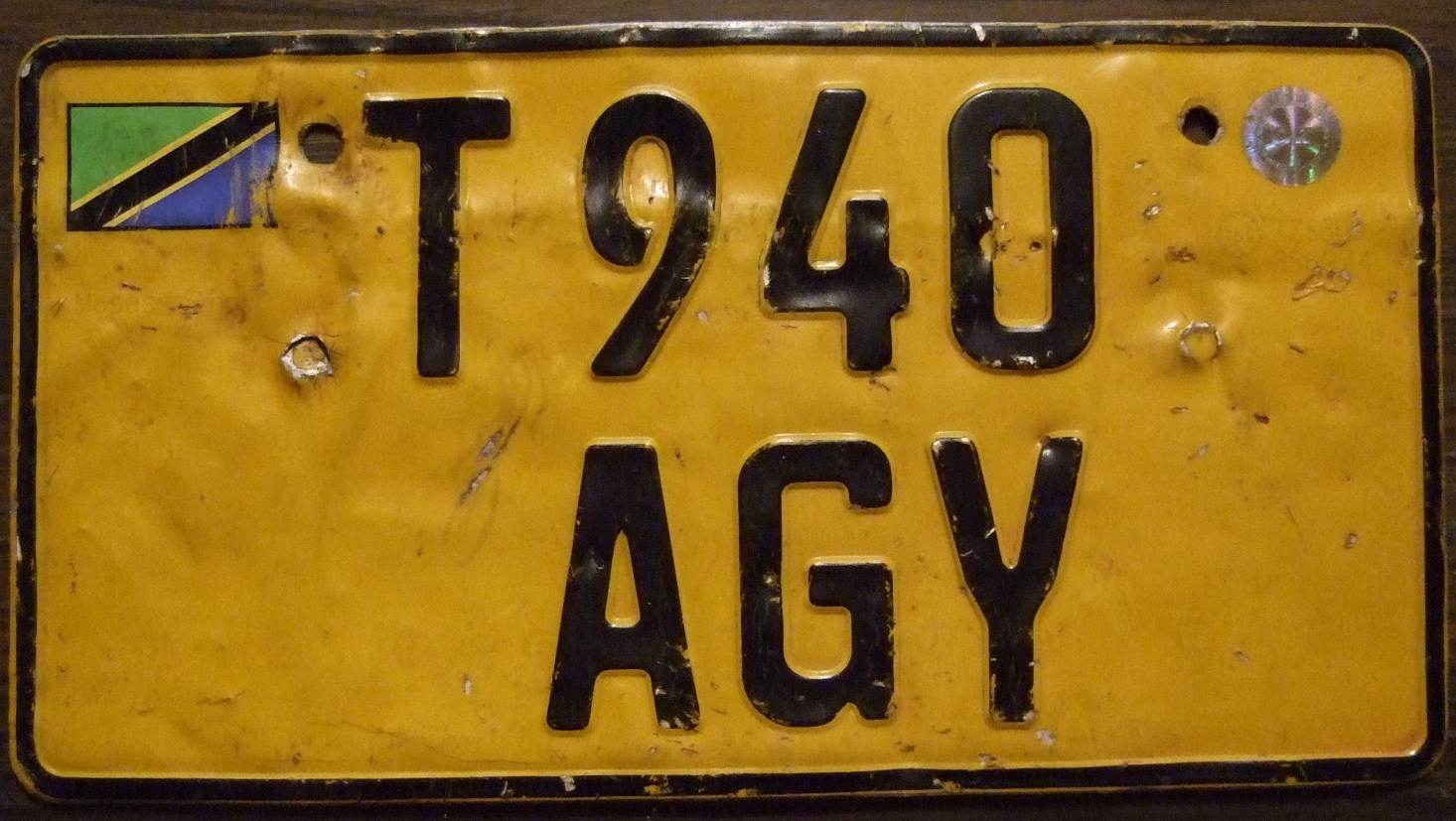
Private plate from 2009

There have been two styles of licence plates in the 21st century.

The first style had the letters and numbers swapped and the letter 'T' was returned to the first character. This plate was very similar to that used by the United Kingdom.

T 257 CWU	T 257CWU
T 257CWU	T 257CWU

The second style added a hologram and the flag of Tanzania to the plates. There are two styles. One style has the hologram and the flag at the left side of the plate followed by "T" and the numbers and characters. The other style has the flag of Tanzania at the top left and a hologram at the top right of the plate with the "T" and numbers between the graphics all in one row and the characters on a second row.

== Diplomatic plates ==
Diplomatic plates for diplomatic missions and consular services are yellow-on-green. 'T' is followed by a three-digit number denoting the country in alphabetical order (001 to 255), 'CD' and a two or three-digit number then follows.

T 111 CD 99

111 denotes the country code.

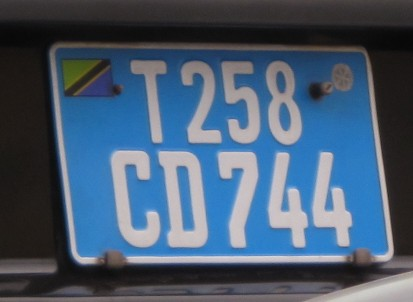
Diplomatic plate 2009

Diplomatic plates for international and regional organizations (United Nations funds and programmes, World Bank...) are white-on-blue. 'T' is followed by a three-digit number denoting the country in alphabetical order (200 to 399), 'CD' and a three-digit number then follows.

T 203 CD 113

203 denotes the organization code.

== Military plates ==
Military plates are white-on-black.

9999 XX 99	9999 XX 99

== National park vehicle plates ==
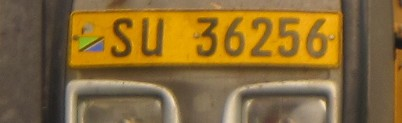
Tanzanian license plate of a national park vehicle

green plates with “01JUL” or “02JUL” or “03JUL” according to department

== Pemba Island ==
Older style Pemba Island plates used the letters "PBA" followed by four digits.

== Zanzibar ==
Zanzibar
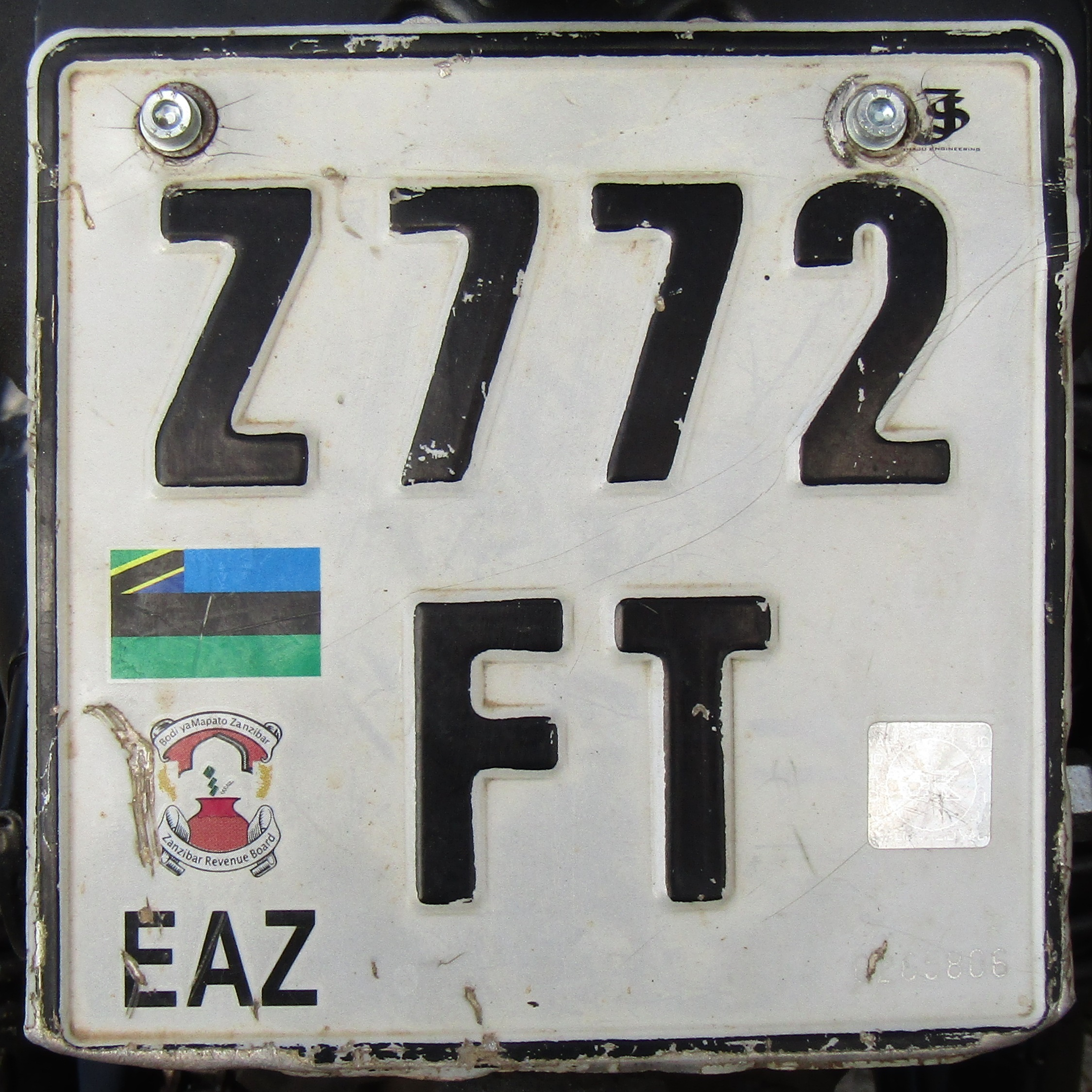
- Zanzibari regular legal standard number plate (motorcycle).
- Country: Zanzibar
- Country code: EAZ

Current series
- Serial format: Z 123ABC
- Colour (front): Black on white
- Colour (rear): Black on white

Earlier Zanzibar plates used a different number system from the rest of Tanzania. By the 1970s plates had changed from the white-on-black style to the black-on-white and black-on-yellow system as used in Britain. Unlike the rest of Tanzania, white plates in Zanzibar were also used on personal vehicles. The 1980s numbering system in Zanzibar was similar to that in the rest of Tanzania, except the preceding 'T' was replaced with a 'Z'.

ZXX 9999	ZXX 9999

Currently Zanzibar plates use the same numbering scheme as the rest of Tanzania, but the plates start with a "Z" (denoting Zanzibar). The letter is followed by three numbers and a combination of two letters. The series started with Z 101 AA and the number continues to increase until it reaches 999. After reaching this number then the next letter series starts (AA followed by AB, etc.). The permutation and combination is expected to continue to Z 999 ZZ. White and Yellow plates are used on Private Cars and White on Maroon is used for Commercial vehicles.

Z 101 AA	Z 101 AA
