= Vehicle registration plates of South Sudan =

Republic of South Sudan
- Country: South Sudan
- Country code: None
- Colour (front): Black on white
- Colour (rear): Black on white

South Sudan requires its residents to register their motor vehicles and display vehicle registration plates.

| Image | First issued | Design | Slogan | Serial format | Serials issued | Notes |
|---|---|---|---|---|---|---|
| | 2007 | | N/A | | | Taxi Issued license plate |
