= Vehicle registration plates of Burundi =

Republic of Burundi
- Country: Burundi
- Country code: RU (unofficially using BU)

Current series
- Size: 520 mm × 110 mm 20.5 in × 4.3 in
- Serial format: Not standard
- Colour (front): Black on White
- Colour (rear): Black on White

Burundi requires its residents to register their motor vehicles and display vehicle registration plates. Current plates are European standard 520 mm × 110 mm, and use Belgian stamping dies. Background is yellow or white depending if it is the rear or front plate.

Image	First issued	Design	Slogan	Serial format	Serials issued	Notes
