= Vehicle registration plates of Bahrain =

Bahrain
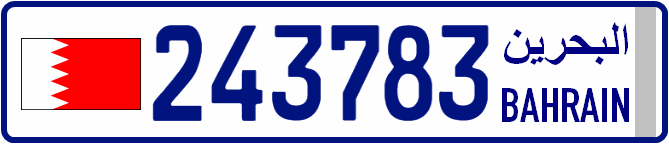
- Current Bahraini registration plate from 2010
- Country: Bahrain
- Country code: BRN

Current series
- Serial format: 123456
- Introduced: 2010

Vehicle registration plates of Bahrain have the Flag of Bahrain and the country's name in Arabic and Latin script. Special vehicles, such as diplomatic cars, have a colored bar in the upper section of the license plate without the flag. License plates for private vehicle owners are blue with a white background. In 2010, Bahrain switched to the version which is in use today.

The international vehicle registration code for Bahrain is BRN.

== Types of license plates ==
License plates for private usage
Type	Image
Private (EU size)	
Private (US size)	
Private motorcycles gf	

License plates for special usage
Type	Image
Diplomatic Corps	
Police	
