= Vehicle registration plates of Mozambique =

Republic of Mozambique
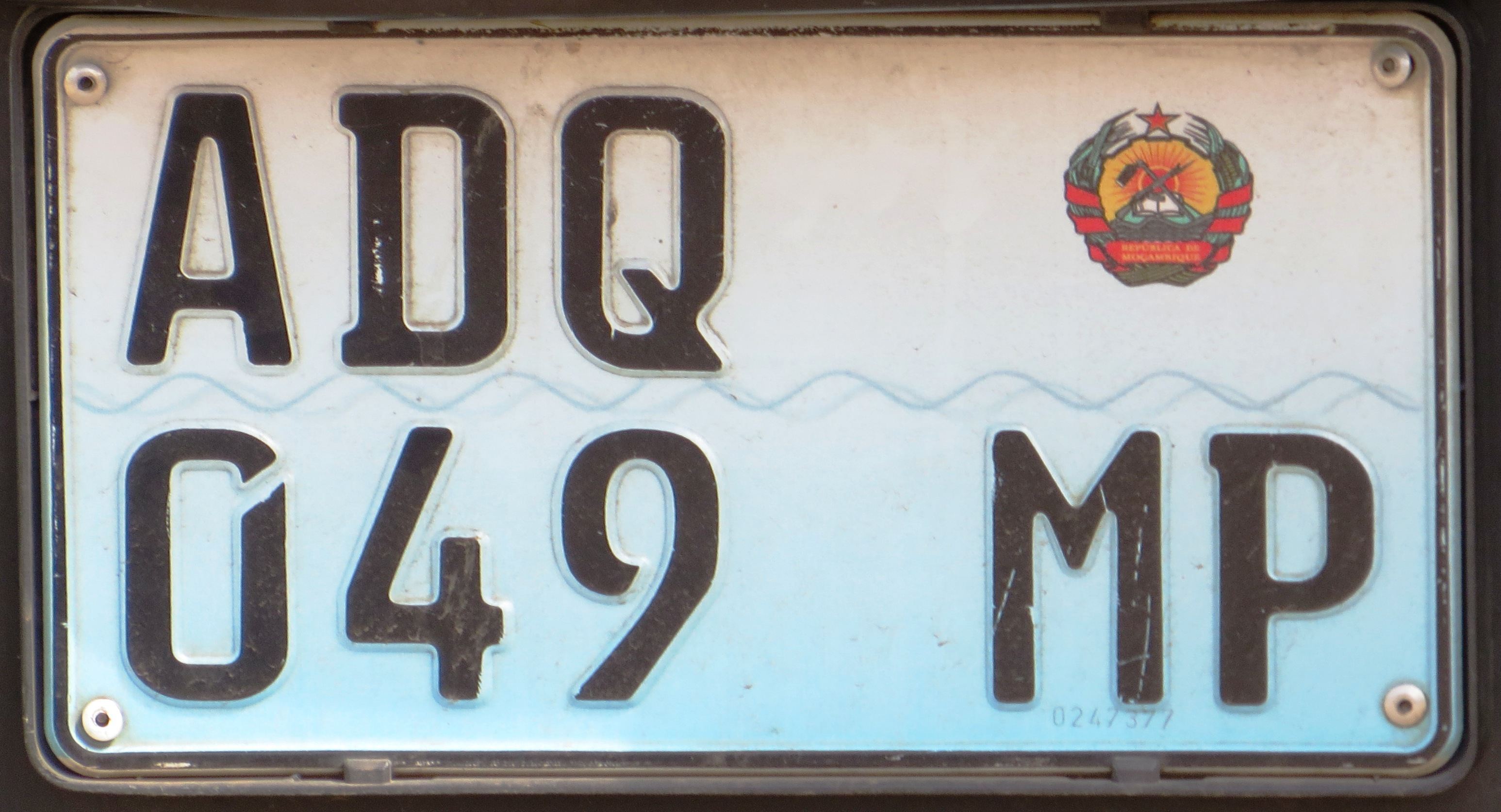
- Mozambican regular legal standard number plate from Maputo (two-row).
- Country: Mozambique
- Country code: MOC

Current series
- Serial format: ABC 123 DE (DE being the regional code)
- Colour (front): Black on light blue
- Colour (rear): Black on light blue

Mozambique requires its residents to register their motor vehicles and display vehicle registration plates both at the rear and front of the vehicle.

== Pre-2011 ==
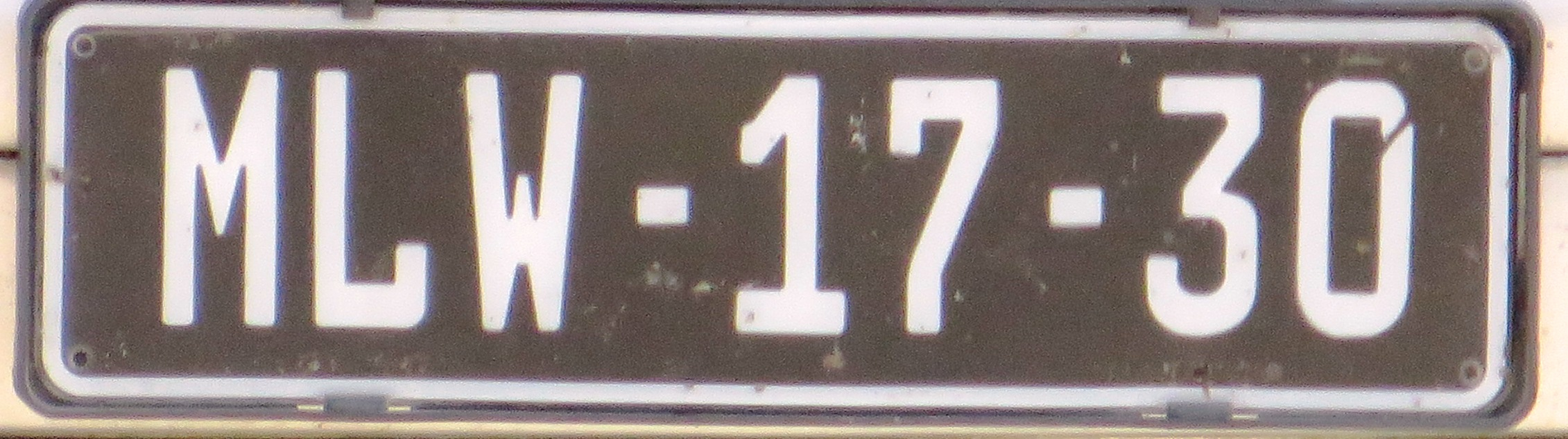

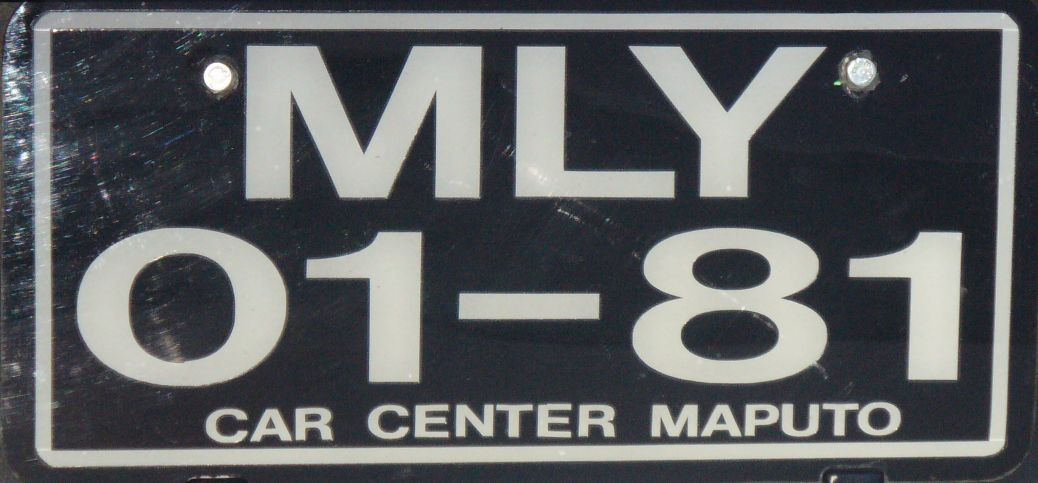

Mozambique kept the same license plate design used during the colonial period until 2011. These are the same as Portuguese plates before 1992 but they have a letter 'M' as the first character. The two letters after the 'M' denote the district where the car was registered.

There are many variations of the plates since the owner must provide his own plates. Almost all plates had white characters on a black background. Both the front and the back plates are the same.

MXX-99-99	MXX-99-99

== 2011 and later ==
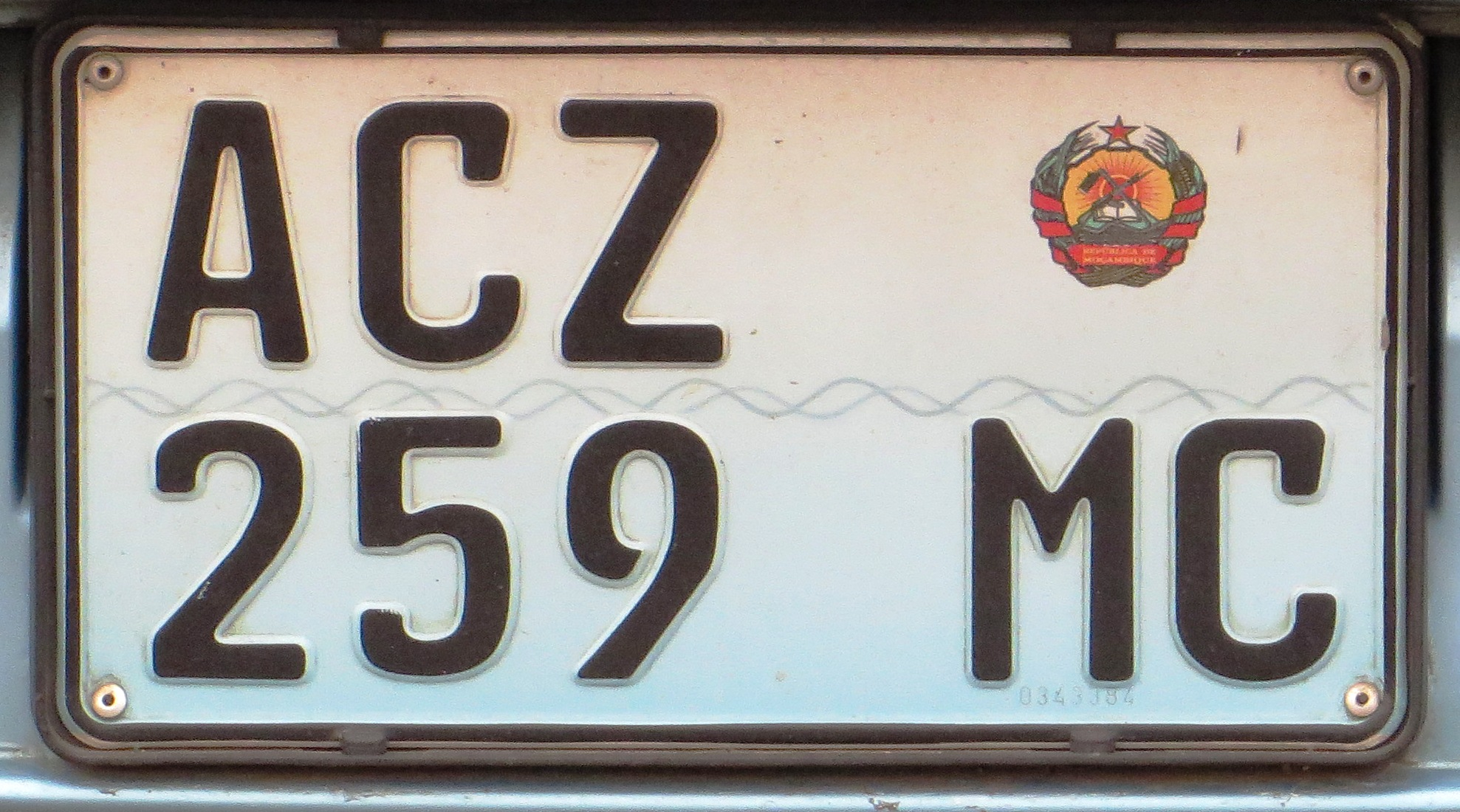
2011 license plate

Since 2011 Mozambique license plates have been completely redesigned. The background to the plate darkens from completely white on the top to light blue at the bottom. Depending on the lighting, some plates appear to have an almost completely blue background that darkens from the top to the bottom. All plates have two gray wavy lines that cross each other in the middle of the plate which may be difficult to see, and there is a raised black border. Additionally, there is a die stamped serial number at the lower right in very small characters.

The plates have either one or two rows of characters. Single row plates are in the format ABC 123 followed by the Mozambique crest and then two more letters that represent the province where the car is registered. Two row plates are in the format ABC at the top left followed by the Mozambique crest offset at the top right on the first row, and then 123 and then the two letter province code on the second row.

Owners of vehicles registered in other countries must register their vehicle in Mozambique within 30 days.

Since 2017 personalized (vanity) license plates have been available.

== Province Codes ==
The following province codes have been observed since the beginning of the 2011 license plate format. Since the largest population center is around Maputo City, the vast majority of registrations show either the "MC" or "MP" code.

- CA = Cabo Delgado
- GZ = Gaza
- IB = Inhambane
- MC = Maputo (city)
- MP = Maputo
- MN = Manica
- NP = Nampula
- NS = Niassa
- SF = Sofala
- TT = Tete
- ZB = Zambezia
