= Vehicle registration plates of Rwanda =

Rwanda requires its residents to register their motor vehicles and display vehicle registration plates. Current plates are European standard 520 mm × 110 mm, and use Belgian stamping dies.

Image	First issued	Design	Slogan	Serial format	Serials issued	Notes
		Black on White for the front plate Black on yellow for the back plate		RXX ###X		
