= Vehicle registration plates of the United Arab Emirates =

UAE
- Country: United Arab Emirates
- Country code: UAE

Current series
- Size: 520 mm × 110 mm 20.5 in × 4.3 in
- Serial format: Depending on the Emirate, A 1234(5) or 1(2) 3456
- Colour (front): Black on white
- Colour (rear): Black on white

Vehicle registration plates of the United Arab Emirates come under the jurisdiction of each of the country's seven emirates and each of them have their unique plate numbering design and system. The international code for the United Arab Emirates is UAE.

== Design ==
Each emirate has its own vehicle registration plate design.

United Arab Emirates vehicle registration plates
Emirate	Image (550x110mm)	Image (335x155mm)	Description and range (applies to current version)
Abu Dhabi			(1(2) 12345) The code (usually the number in the red area) can be either 1, 4 to 22 or 50 (to celebrate the UAE’s 50th National Day); the plate number can be only up to five digits.
Ajman			(A12345) Numbers contain up to 5 digits, and only A, B, C, D, E, and H can be the first letter.
Dubai			(A12345) AA, BB, CC, DD or EE can also be a code, and numbers contain a maximum of five digits. The following vehicles with special registration have special number plates: Taxis (max. 4 digits, taxi symbol, yellow color), Two-Wheelers (max. 5 digits, bike symbol), Classic Cars (max. 5 digits, CLASSIC on left hand side in yellow), Exported Cars (max. 4 digits, Blue Color), Vehicles on transit (max. 5 digits, Green color) and Police Vehicles (max. 4 digits, Dark Green color design on left hand side).
Fujairah			Fujairah license plates can have one of the letters: A to G, K, M, P, R, S, or T, on a white plate. Numbers contain a maximum of five digits.
Ras Al Khaimah			Ras Al Khaimah license plates can have one of the letters: A, C, D, I, K, M, N, S, V or Y, on a white plate, or feature a fort on the top side of the plate. Numbers contain a maximum of five digits.
Sharjah			Sharjah license plates either may or may not include a category number (also known as the plate’s “code”), spanning from 1 to 4 (possibly 1 to 5 in the future) on an orange or a white plate. License plates may have numbers contain a maximum of five digits.
Umm Al Quwain			Umm al-Quwain license plates can have one of the letters: A, B, C, D, E, F, G, H, I or X, on a white plate. Numbers contain a maximum of five digits.

The Sharjah Police have launched new vehicle number plates that have modern design and enhanced quality.
