= Vehicle registration plates of Benin =

Republic of Benin
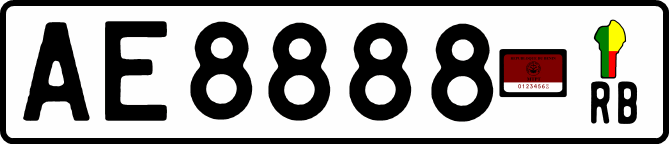
- Beninese regular legal standard number plate.
- Country: Benin
- Country code: DY (unofficially using RB)

Current series
- Size: 520 mm × 110 mm 20.5 in × 4.3 in
- Serial format: Not standard
- Colour (front): Black on white
- Colour (rear): Black on white

The vehicle registration plates of Benin is a legal form requiring the citizens of Benin to have the car registered.

== Regular license plates ==
License plates of Benin are made in European shape and size. The current scheme of regular license plates for private vehicles of Benin was introduced in the early 1990s. It has the format A1234, later AB1234 where AB - Series 1234 - number. Regular plates have a white background with black signs. At the right side of the plate are image maps of the country in the colors of the national flag under which the unofficial code has RB. Between the main group symbols and code placed rectangular sticker. There is a two-line version of the format license plate AB / 1234. License plate for motorcycles format is 1A / 2345, where 1A - Series, 2345 - number. Regional coding is missing.

== Other formats ==
=== Commercial vehicles ===
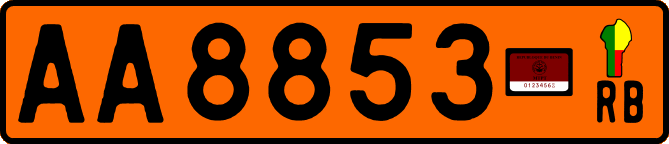
Commercial license Plate

Commercial vehicles have license plates with red symbols on an orange background. Format registration marks are similar to regular. At the right side of the plate are image maps of the country in the colors of the national flag under which the code has RB. Between the main group symbols and code placed rectangular sticker.

=== State transport ===
The state transport has license plates with white characters on a blue background. Format registration marks are similar to regular. At the right side of the plate are image maps of the country in the colors of the national flag under which the code has RB. Between the main group symbols and code placed rectangular sticker. License plate for motorcycles - dvoryadkovi format 1A / 2345, where 1A - Series, 2345 - room with white characters on a red background.

=== Government transport ===
Government trucks have license plates with white characters on a blue background. The format of license plates looks OFFICIEL123, which 123 number. At the right side of the plate are image maps of the country in the colors of the national flag under which the code has RB.

=== Diplomatic license plates ===
Diplomatic license plates are used by the higher level officials of diplomatic missions. These have white characters on a green background and format 123CMD, which 123 - country code, CMD - pointer as chairman of the diplomatic mission. At the right side of the plate are image maps of the country in the colors of the national flag under which the code has RB. Between the main group symbols and code placed rectangular sticker.
