= Vehicle registration plates of Peru =

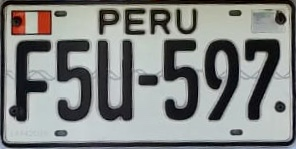
Current license plate.

Peru requires its residents to register their motor vehicles and display vehicle registration plates. Current plates are North American standard 6 in × 12 in (150 mm × 300 mm).

All vehicles are required to display plates on the front and back. Peculiarly, taxis in Peru are also required to display the characters of the license plates on each side of the vehicle. This is done with a large decal.

== 1924 - 1973: Early plates ==
License plates issued up to 1973 came in a variety of colors and styles. Many years had city names placed on them which created a variety of different plates issued each year.

1924 - 1973
Image	Year	Type	Slogan	Serial format	Serials issued	Notes
	1963	Passenger car	None	1-23-45		
	1966	Passenger car	None	12 34-56		

== 1974 - 1995 Series ==
The first letter of these plates indicated the vehicle type, and the chart below shows the letters assigned to each type. The second letter indicated the region (or province for the City of Lima) where the vehicle was registered. The second chart below shows these codes.

Vehicle Types 1975 - 1995
Letter(s)	Type
A, B, C, D, E, F, G, H, I, J, K, L	Automobile
M, N	Motorcycle, moped
O, P	Pickup truck
Q	Panel truck
R	Rural truck, SUV
S, T	Station wagon
U, V	Bus
W, X	Truck
Y	Tractor truck
Z	Trailer, semi-trailer

Regions and Province
Letter(s)	Region	Letter(s)	Region
A	Tumbes	N	Cerro de Pasco
B	Piura	P	Junín
C	Lambayeque	R	Huancavelica
D	La Libertad	S	Ayacucho
E	Ancash	T	Apurímac
F	Ica	U	Puno
G, I, O, Q	Lima and Callao	V	Madre de Dios
H	Arequipa	W	Amazonas
J	Moquegua	X	San Martín
K	Tacna	Y	Loreto y Ucayali
L	Cajamarca	Z	Cusco
M	Huánuco		

Series of 1975 - 1995
Image	Year	Type	Slogan	Serial format	Serials issued	Notes
	1994	Public Transport	None	ABC-123		

== 1995 - 2009 Series ==
Plates issued during the years 1995 - 2009 continued to use the same format that was begun in 1975. The first letter continued to indicate the vehicle type, and the second letter indicated the region or province. These plates were black characters on a yellow background and they continued to use the same format, ABC-123, until all combinations in a region or province were exhausted. When complete, the old series was followed by plates with black characters on a white background, but they used the format AB-1234.

Series of 1995 - 2009
Image	Year	Type	Slogan	Serial format	Serials issued	Notes
	2008	Passenger car	None	AB-1234		

== 2010 Series ==
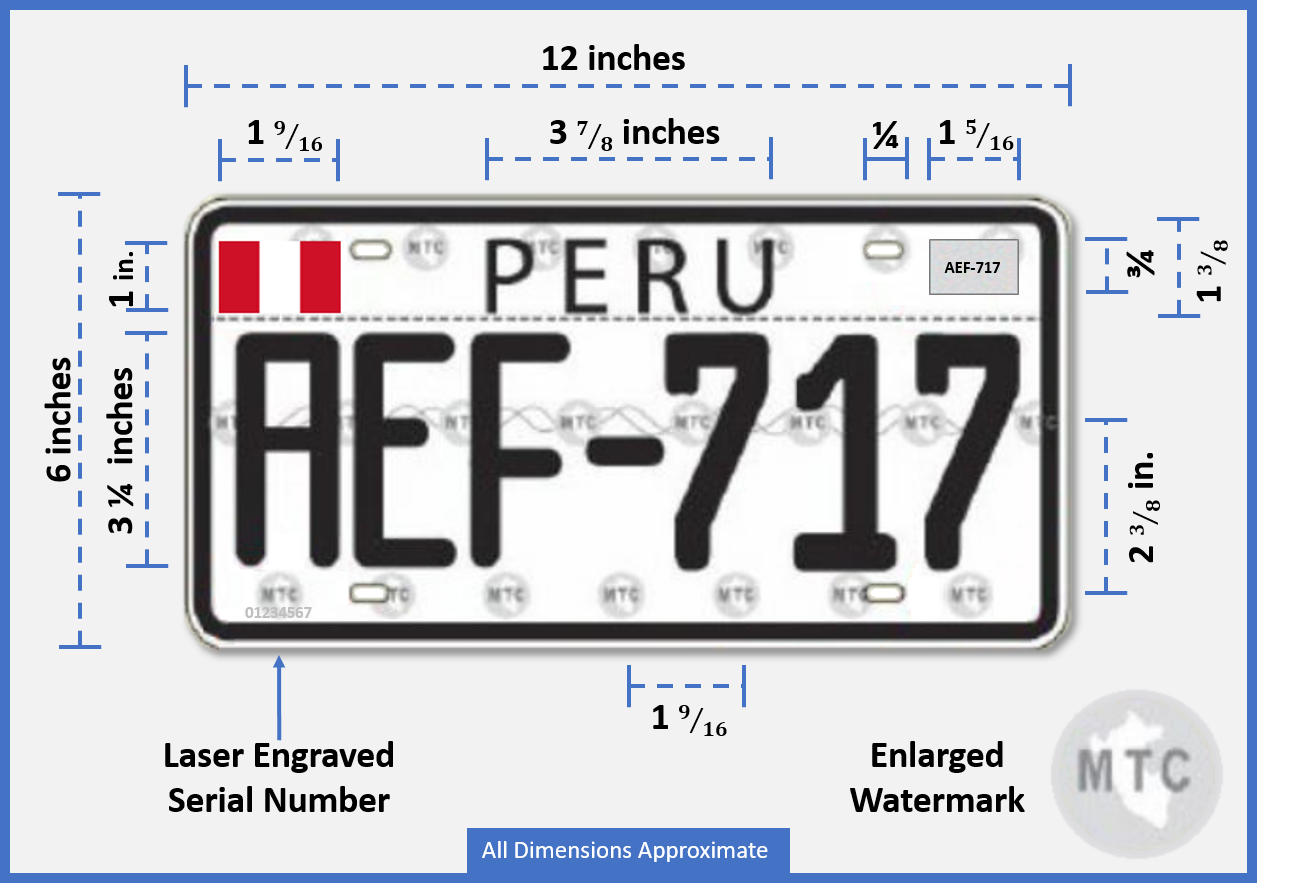
2010 license plate dimensions

The redesign of the Peruvian plates included many changes. The national flag of Peru is displayed in color, without the shield, in the upper left hand corner. The word Peru is centered at the top in all capital letters. There is a holographic label at the top right with the plate number and nanotext, and any attempt to remove it will cause its destruction. The background to the plate has reflective sheeting which contains a high security seal (watermark). At the lower left of the plate a security serial number is laser engraved into the plate. In the background of the center of the plate is a three-dimensional interwoven sine wave. The plates are made of aluminum and are 150 mm tall by 300 mm wide except for motorcycles which are 110 mm tall by 190 mm wide. The holographic seal is also smaller on the motorcycle plates.

=== Region and province codes ===
The new series of plates began to be issued in January 2010. The first character of the plate continued to designate the region or province, but the letters were reassigned to different regions. With the new plate colors representing the vehicle type, the second character no longer represented the vehicle type.

Regions and Province Codes
First Letter	Region(s)	Registration Area
A, B, C, D, F	Lima	9
E*	Not used	
G, I, J, N, O, Q, R	Reserved for future use	
H	Ancash	7
L	Loreto	4
K, M	Amazonas, Cajamarca, Lambayeque	2
P	Piura, Tumbes	1
S	San Martín	3
T	La Libertad	5
U	Ucayali	6
V	Arequipa	12
W	Huanuco, Junin, Pasco	8
X	Apurimac, Cusco, Madre de Dios	10
Y	Ayacucho, Huancavelica, Ica	11
Z	Moquegua, Puno, Tacna	13

*The initial letter "E" designates plates that are in the Special category of plates (diplomatic, emergency, exhibition, government, police, rotary, and temporary).

=== Regular Series plates ===
The second character of these plates first takes on a numerical value of 1 to 9 (in order) followed by the number 0, and then the letters of the alphabet in alphabetical order. All vehicles now are issued the so-called "third plate" which is a windshield sticker that includes an RFID chip. The RFID chip allows the police to electronically verify the registration of the vehicle with a hand-held reader. The third plate cannot be removed from the windshield without it being destroyed.

Regular Series of 2010 License Plates
Image	Type	Serial format	Serials issued	Notes
	Automobile	ABC-123, AB1-234, A1B-234		
	City and interurban bus	A1B-234		Plates end in numbers 700-799.
	Interprovincial bus	ABC-123, AB1-234, A1B-234		Plates end in numbers 950-969.
	Large motorcycle	AB-1234		While often cited as being for mototaxis this series encompasses all motorcycles greater than 50cc or those capable of more than 50 km/h. Plates end in numbers 6000-9999.
	Small motorcycle	AB-1234		Plates end in numbers 0000-5999.
	Taxi	A1B-234		Plates end in numbers 600-699.
	Trailer	ABC-123, AB1-234, A1B-234		
	Truck	ABC-123, AB1-234, A1B-234		

=== Special Series plates ===
All Special Series plates are easily distinguished by the small letter "E," representing the Spanish word especial, as the first character at the left hand side of the plate. To prevent confusion, the letter "E" is not used to identify any region or province.

Special Series of 2010 License Plates
Image	Type	Serial format	Serials issued	Notes
	Diplomatic	E CA-123		CC: Consular Corps; CD: Diplomatic Corps; MI: International Mission; TA: Technical Administrative Staff
	Emergency vehicle	E UA-123		Ambulances and fire fighting vehicles
	Exhibition	E EX-123		Plates assigned to a vehicle before the vehicle has received its permanent registration. The letter "H" has been reserved for future use (replacing "X").
	Governmental vehicles	E GA-123		
	Police vehicles	E PA-123		The letters "L", "M", and "N" have been reserved for future use (replacing "P")
	Temporary vehicles	E ZA-123		Plates assigned to a vehicle upon temporarily entering the country. Plates must be returned to the customs authority when leaving the country.
	Used imported vehicles	E RM-123		Plates assigned to a used vehicle brought into the country for repair purposes or to be sold. These plates are good for a maximum of seven days.

=== Papal visit ===
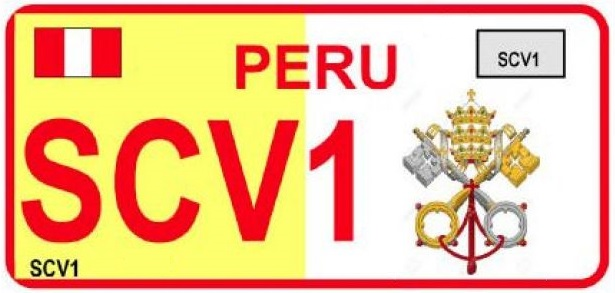
Plate issued for the Pope's visit to Peru in 2018

For the visit of the Roman Catholic Pope, Francis, from 18–21 January 2018, special license plates were created. These plates have all of the same security features as regular plates, but the coloring, yellow and white which are the official colors of the Holy See, the lettering, and the use of the coat of arms of the Vatican, are unique to these plates. Three license plates of the style shown here were produced. Additionally, there were 30 Exhibition plates issued for the Papal delegation.
