= Vehicle registration plates of Kuwait =

State of Kuwait
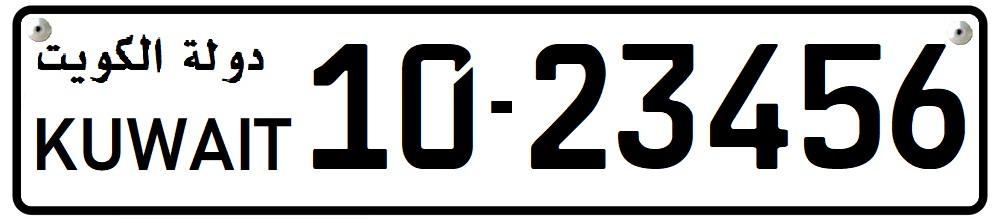
- Kuwaiti regular legal standard number plate, Euro-sized.
- Country: Kuwait
- Country code: KWT

Current series
- Size: 520 mm × 110 mm 20.5 in × 4.3 in
- Serial format: 12-45678
- Colour (front): Black on white
- Colour (rear): Black on white

Vehicle registration plates of Kuwait started in 1950. The current version started in 2008.

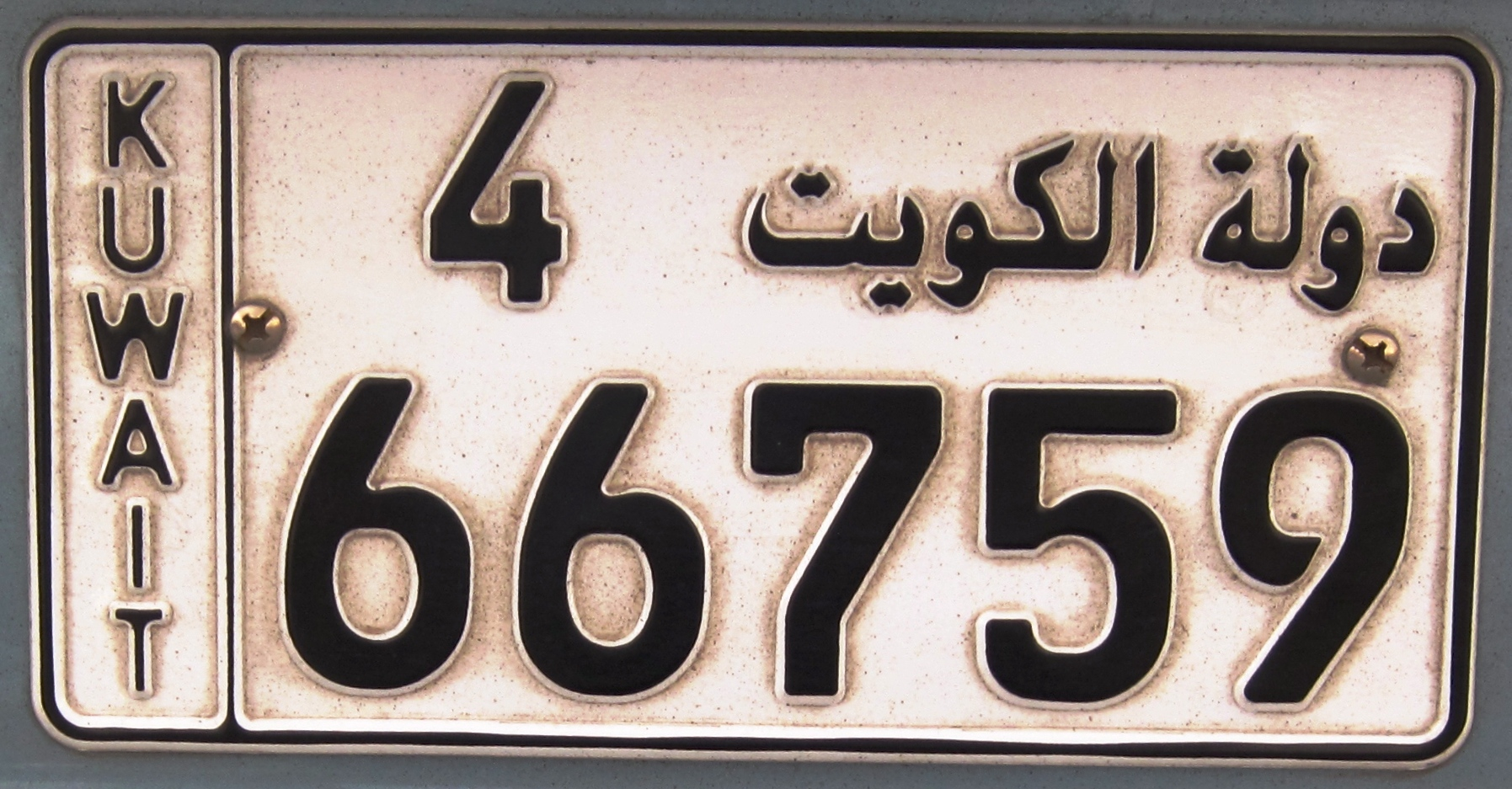
plate of Kuwait

== Vehicle types ==
Vehicle types
Type	Plate	Size and Design	Text	Code
Private		33.5 x 15.5 cm Black on White	دولة الكويت (Dawlat al-Kuwayt); State of Kuwait	1 - 89
Private		52.0 x 11.0 cm Black on White	دولة الكويت (Dawlat al-Kuwayt); State of Kuwait	1 - 89
Private		33.5 x 8.5 cm Black on White	دولة الكويت (Dawlat al-Kuwayt); State of Kuwait	1 - 89
Motorcycle		15.5 x 15.5 cm Black on White	دولة الكويت / دراجة (Dawlat al-Kuwayt / Darajja); State of Kuwait / Motorcycle	1–10
Public		33.5 x 15.5 cm Black on Yellow	دولة الكويت (Dawlat al-Kuwayt); State of Kuwait	90-99
Public		52.0 x 11.0 cm Black on Yellow	دولة الكويت (Dawlat al-Kuwayt); State of Kuwait	90-99
Public		33.5 x 8.5 cm Black on Yellow	دولة الكويت (Dawlat al-Kuwayt); State of Kuwait	90-99
Police		33.5 x 15.5 cm White on Black	POLICE شرطة (Shurta)	—
Government		33.5 x 15.5 cm Black on Blue	دولة الكويت — حكومة (Dawlat al-Kuwayt — Ħukuma); State of Kuwait — Government	—
Army		33.5 x 15.5 cm Black on Beige	الجيش الكويتي (al-Jaysh al-Kuwayt — Ħukuma); Kuwaiti Army	—
Corps Diplomatique		33.5 x 15.5 cm Blue on White; Red band along the bottom	هيئة دبلوماسية / C.D (Hay'a Diblumasya); Corps Diplomatic	—
Commercial	This is a Vehicle plate for Commercial Vehicles in Kuwait.	33.5 x 15.5 cm Black on Pink	دولة الكويت — تجاري (Dawlat al-Kuwayt —Tijaari); State of Kuwait — Commercial	—
Temporary Customs	Temporary Customs	33.5 x 15.5 cm Black on Purple	دولة الكويت — جمرك مؤقت (Dawlat al-Kuwayt —Jummruk — Mu'akkat); State of Kuwait — Temporary Customs	—
Police Motorcycle	Police Motorcycle	15.5 x 15.5 cm White on Black	شرطة (Shurta); Police	—
Construction	Construction	33.5 x 15.5 cm Black on Orange	دولة الكويت — إنشاءت (Dawlat al-Kuwayt —Inshaa'aat); State of Kuwait — Construction	—
National Guard	National Guard	33.5 x 15.5 cm Yellow on Green	الحرس الوطني (al-Ħaras — al-Watani); National Guard	—
Emiri Bureau	Emiri Bureau	33.5 x 15.5 cm White on Blue	دولة الكويت — الديوان الأميري (Dawlat al-Kuwayt —ad-Diwaan — al-Amiri); State of Kuwait — Emiri Bureau	—
Export	Export	33.5 x 15.5 cm Black on Green	دولة الكويت — تصدير (Dawlat al-Kuwayt —Tasdeer); State of Kuwait — Export	—
Emiri Guard	Emiri Guard	33.5 x 15.5 cm White on Blue	الحرس — الأميري "(al-Ħaras al-Amiri)" "Emiri Guard"	—
General Firefighting	General Firefighting.	33.5 x 15.5 cm Black on Red	FIRE — الإطفاء العام "(al-itfā' al-ām)" "General Firefighting"	—
Public Transportations	Public Transportations.	33.5 x 15.5 cm Black on Yellow	دولة الكويت "(Dawlat al-Kuwayt)" "State of Kuwait"	91
Public Buses	Public Buses.	33.5 x 15.5 cm Black on Yellow	دولة الكويت "(Dawlat al-Kuwayt)" "State of Kuwait"	92
Public Taxis	Public Taxis.	33.5 x 15.5 cm Black on Yellow	دولة الكويت "(Dawlat al-Kuwayt)" "State of Kuwait"	93
Public Goods Exportation	Public Goods Exportation.	33.5 x 15.5 cm Black on Yellow	دولة الكويت "(Dawlat al-Kuwayt)" "State of Kuwait"	95
