= Utsch =

German manufacturer of licence plates

Erich Utsch AG
- Company type: Private
- Industry: Manufacturing
- Founded: 1961; 64 years ago
- Founder: Erich Utsch
- Headquarters: Siegen, Germany
- Area served: Worldwide
- Key people: Dominic Höffgen (CEO); Ulrich Waldschmidt (Chairman of the Supervisory Board)
- Products: Vehicle license plates
- Revenue: ▲€84.9 million (2021)
- Number of employees: ▲413 (2021)
- Website: utsch.com

Erich Utsch AG is a manufacturing company headquartered in Siegen, Germany. It was founded in 1961 as a family business and sold to external investors in 2016. Utsch is specialized in vehicle registration and identification, particularly license plates.

== History ==
In 1961 Erich Utsch founded a company to produce license plates. He saw a business opportunity in the increasing motorization of the post-war period. During the very first years, Utsch used a converted wine press; later, the company developed specialized presses. After Utsch died in 1969, his son Manfred took over management. He invested in new technologies and gradually entered foreign markets. As of the 2015 fiscal year, 80% of all revenues came from outside Germany.

2001, Utsch changed its legal structure from Kommanditgesellschaft (KG) to Aktiengesellschaft (AG). Until 2016, the founder family retained a majority stake in the company. Then Manfred Utsch sold the company to Australian and Swedish investors.

In 2020, Utsch merged with Hill Numberplates, a manufacturer with major activities in the United Kingdom and France and a presence in parts of Asia, and Africa. The merger resulted in the world's largest license plate group.

== Corporation ==
Utsch is a private German stock corporation. The Erich Utsch AG is the group's parent, with a dozen fully consolidated subsidiaries in several countries, including France, Spain, and the United Kingdom. The LicenSys Australasia Pty. Ltd. is a semi-independent subgroup of Utsch, being responsible for the Asia-Pacific markets.

== Products ==
The company's core business is the production of vehicle license plates. Utsch supports various country-specific security features such as emblems, laser codes, watermarks, or holograms.

Besides the production of license plates, Utsch sells machines, tools, and other equipment for related production and distribution processes. These include blocking and counter-pressure tools, embossing presses, hot stamping machines, laminators, and laser coding equipment.

Customers include governments from countries from around the world. The government of Italy, for example, commissioned Utsch in 1998 to handle the conversion of license plates to new EU standards; the company supplied millions of official license plates in to Egypt and Iraq in 2008.
