= Vehicle registration plates of the Gambia =

The Gambia
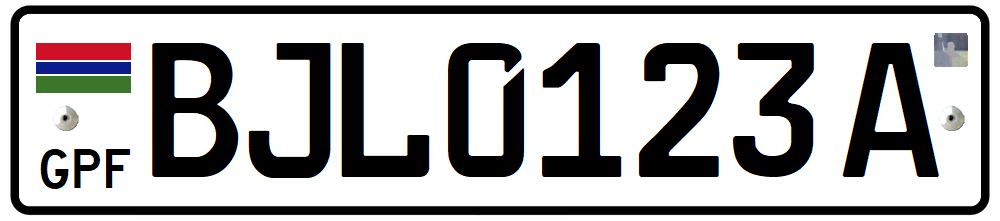
- Current registration plate from the Gambia.
- Country: The Gambia
- Country code: WAG

Current series
- Size: 520 mm × 110 mm 20.5 in × 4.3 in
- Serial format: AB(C)0123D (for standard plates)
- Colour (front): Black on white
- Colour (rear): Black on white

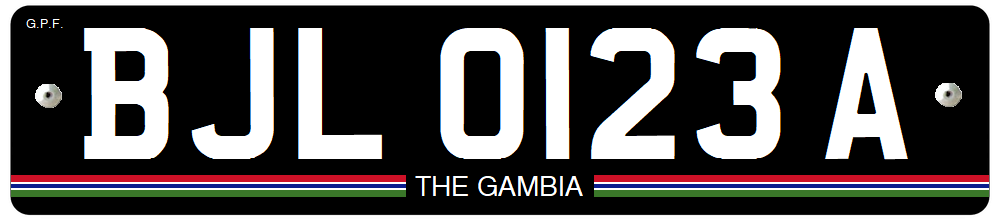
Registration plate from the Gambia, 1999-2019

Registration plates of the Gambia have, since 2019 have been coloured yellow or white with black lettering. To the left is the Gambia flag and the letters "GPF". The plates are in the standard European size, and feature the German FE font. The first set of letters denote the city of issue, such as BJL for Banjul.

== 2019-Present ==
From 2019 onwards, a black-on-white colour scheme was introduced. This new license plate format uses the font FE-Schrift. The flag strip at the bottom of the license plate has been removed in this version, and replaced by a flag on the top left corner of the plate. Underneath the plate, there's a 3-letter code, GPF. GPF isn't the country's standard traffic code, that would be WAG. GPF stands for The Gambia Police Force, who are responsible for issuing of the license plates.

Some of the regional codes have also changed since the previous version. The size of motorcycle plates have also changed from 19 cm x 11 cm to 24 cm x 13 cm.

Vehicle Type	Image	Design	Serial format	Notes
Passenger Vehicles		52 cm x 11 cm Black on White; Gambian Flag as well as the text GPF on the left side of the license plate	XXX-0123-A; XX-0123-A	XXX or XX indicate the three or two letter regional code. BJL indicates Banjul for example.
Passenger Vehicles		27x20 cm Black on White; Gambian Flag as well as the text GPF on the top left corner of the license plate	XXX-0123-A; XX-0123-A	XXX or XX indicate the three or two letter regional code. BJL indicates Banjul for example.
Commercial Vehicles		52 cm x 11 cm Black on yellow Gambian Flag as well as the text GPF on the top left corner of the license plate	XXX-0123-A; XX-0123-A	XXX or XX indicate the three or two letter regional code. BJL indicates Banjul for example.
Commercial Vehicles		27x20 cm Black on yellow Gambian Flag as well as the text GPF on the top left corner of the license plate	XXX-0123-A; XX-0123-A	XXX or XX indicate the three or two letter regional code. BJL indicates Banjul for example.
Motorcycle		24 cm x 13 cm Black on White; Gambian Flag as well as the text GPF on the top left corner of the license plate	MC-XXX-0123-A; MC-XX-0123-A	XXX or XX indicate the three or two letter regional code. BJL indicates Banjul for example.

== 1999-2019 ==
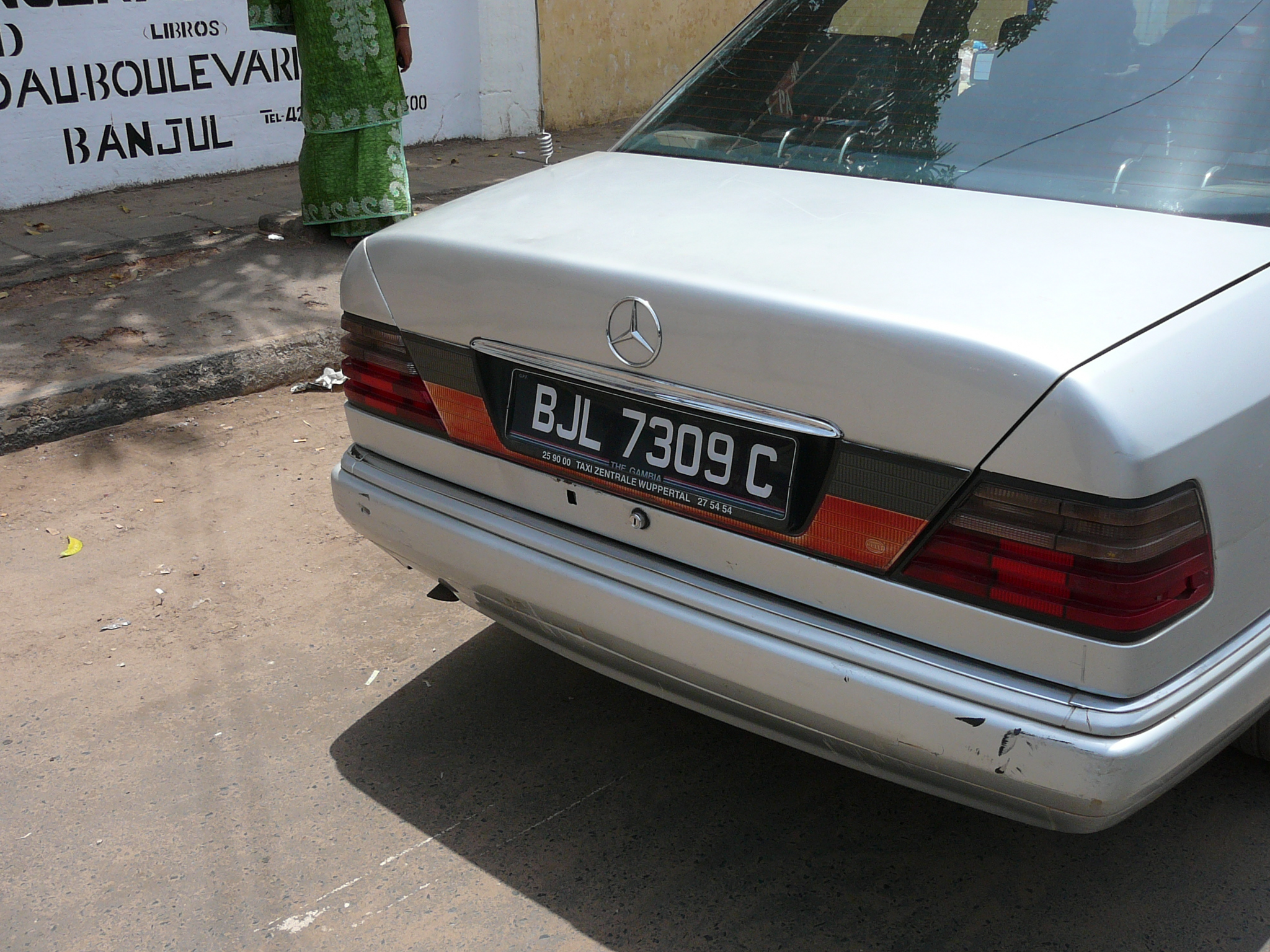
Former Gambian number plate in Banjul

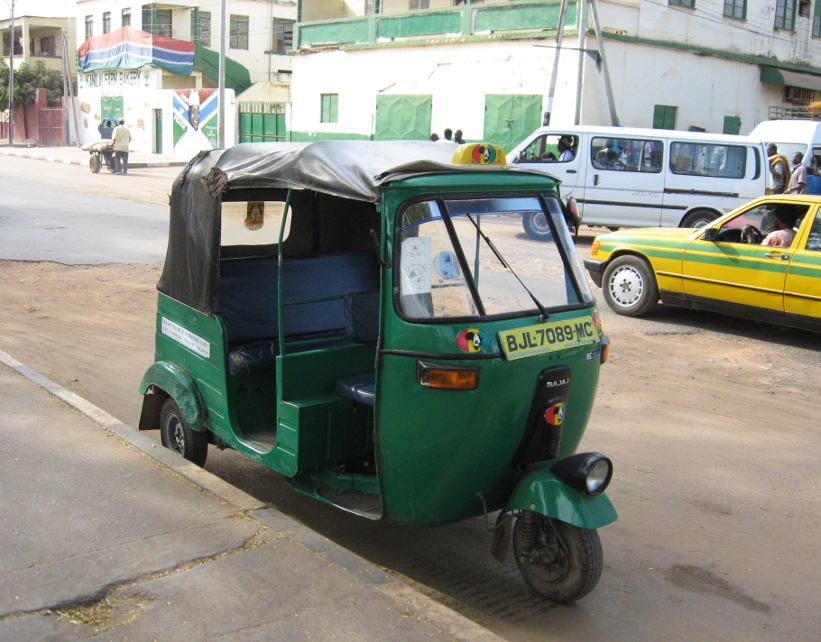
A tuk-tuk showing a motorcycle plate

From 1999 a white-on-black colour scheme was introduced, which is similar to an older scheme dating from before independence. The MC in motorcycle plates was moved to the front. This license plate format comes with a strip at the bottom of the plate with the colors of the Gambian flag, and a text in the center that says The Gambia. Standard plates were issued in the font Mandatory.

Vehicle Type	Image	Design	Serial format	Notes
Passenger Vehicles		52 cm x 11 cm White on black Bottom strip in Gambian Flag Text in the center bottom, saying The Gambia	XXX-0123-A; XX-0123-A	XXX or XX indicate the three or two letter regional code. BJL indicates Banjul for example.
Passenger Vehicles		27x20 cm White on black Bottom strip in Gambian Flag Text in the center bottom, saying The Gambia	XXX-0123-A; XX-0123-A	XXX or XX indicate the three or two letter regional code. BJL indicates Banjul for example.
Commercial Vehicles		52 cm x 11 cm Black on yellow Bottom strip in Gambian Flag Text in the center bottom, saying The Gambia	XXX-0123-A; XX-0123-A	XXX or XX indicate the three or two letter regional code. BJL indicates Banjul for example.
Commercial Vehicles		27x20 cm Black on yellow Bottom strip in Gambian Flag Text in the center bottom, saying The Gambia	XXX-0123-A; XX-0123-A	XXX or XX indicate the three or two letter regional code. BJL indicates Banjul for example.
Motorcycle		19 cm x 11 cm White on Black; Bottom strip in Gambian Flag Text in the center bottom, saying The Gambia	MC-XXX-0123; MC-XX-0123	XXX or XX indicate the three or two letter regional code. BJL indicates Banjul for example. MC indicates Motorcycle
Rickshaw		Front Plate: 52 cm x 11 cm Black on yellow Bottom strip in Gambian Flag Text in the center bottom, saying The Gambia	XXX-0123-MC; XX-0123-MC	XXX or XX indicate the three or two letter regional code. BJL indicates Banjul for example. MC indicates Motorcycle
Rickshaw		Rear Plate: 27x20 cm Black on yellow Bottom strip in Gambian Flag Text in the center bottom, saying The Gambia	XXX-0123-MC; XX-0123-MC	XXX or XX indicate the three or two letter regional code. BJL indicates Banjul for example. MC indicates Motorcycle

== Regional Codes ==
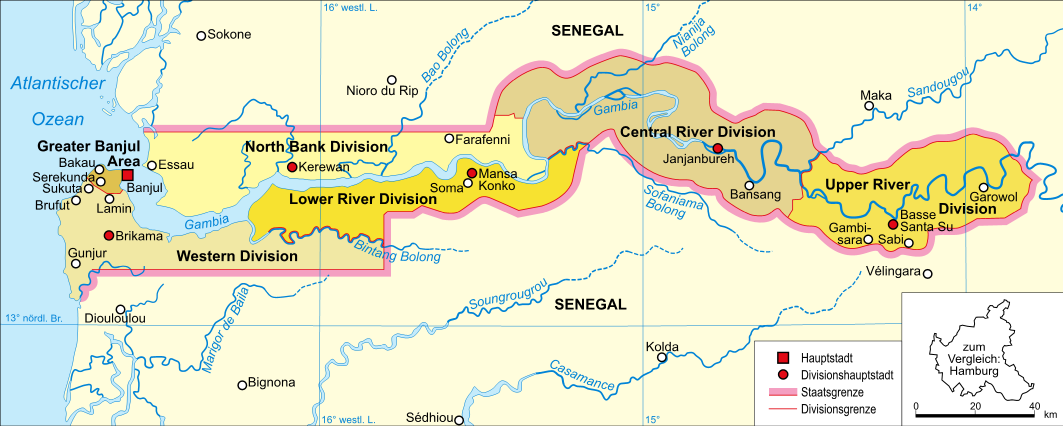
Administrative divisions of the Gambia

Subdivision name	Code 1994-2019	Code 2019-Present
Banjul	BJL	BJL
West Coast Region	WD	WCR
North Bank Region	NBD	NBR
Lower River Region	LRD	LRR
Central River Region	CRD	CRR
Upper River Region	URD	URR
Kanifing Municipality	KM	KM

== Previous formats ==
=== 1962-1982 ===
The number plates in this series started with GA. They had 4 digits. Private vehicle plates were White on Black background. Commercial plates were red on white background. However, commercial plates had their color change in 1978, and were then issued in black on yellow.

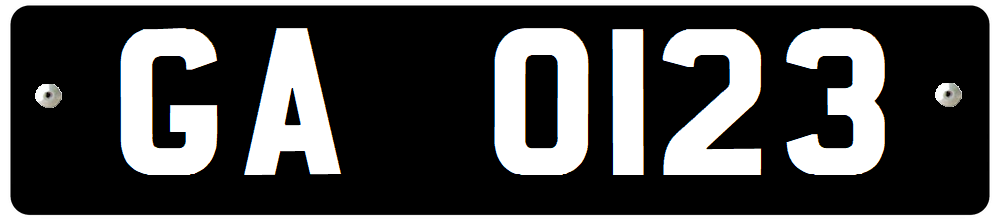
Gambian Passenger vehicle license plate, 1962 to 1982

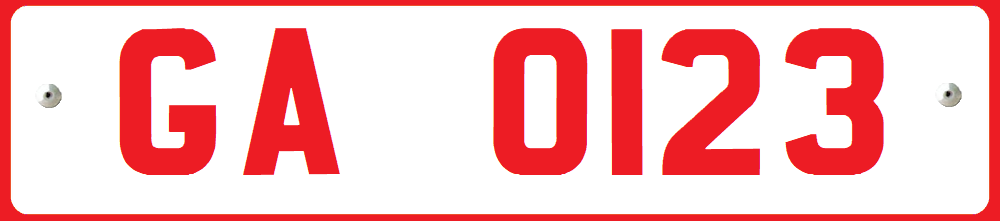
Gambian Commercial vehicle license plate, 1962 to 1978

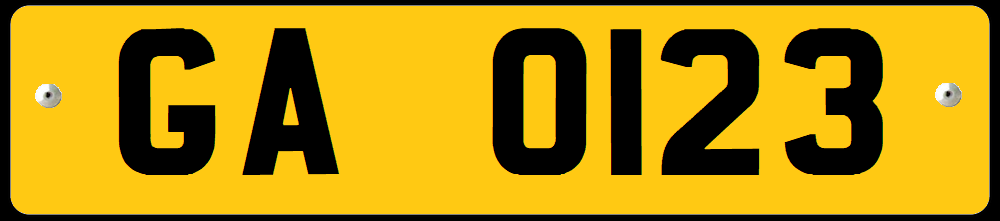
Gambian Commercial vehicle license plate, 1978 to 1982

=== 1982-1991 ===
The number plates in this series started with G1A. They had 4 digits. Private vehicle plates were White on Black background. Commercial plates were black on yellow background.

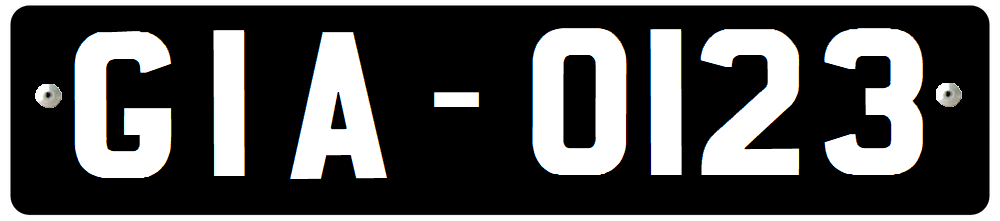
Gambian Passenger vehicle license plate, 1982 to 1991

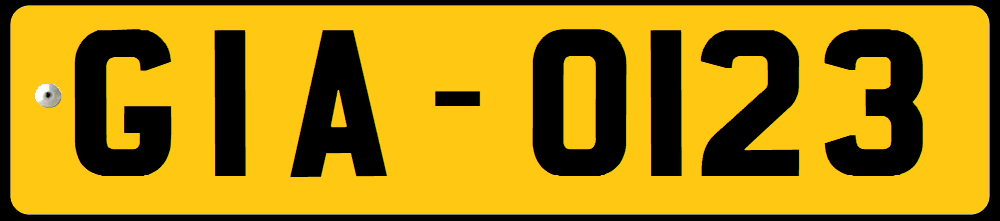
Gambian Commercial vehicle license plate, 1982 to 1991

=== 1991-1994 ===
The number plates in this series started with G2A. They had 4 digits. Private vehicle plates were Black on White background. Commercial plates were black on yellow background.

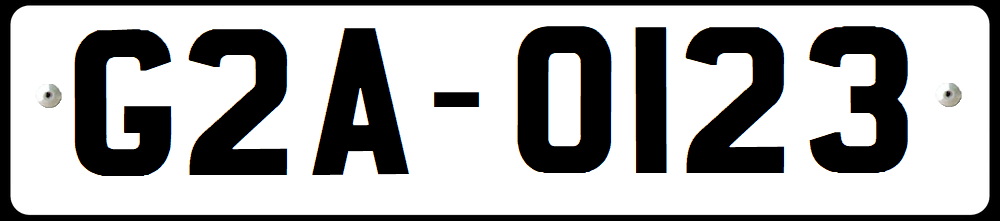
Gambian Passenger vehicle license plate, 1991 to 1994

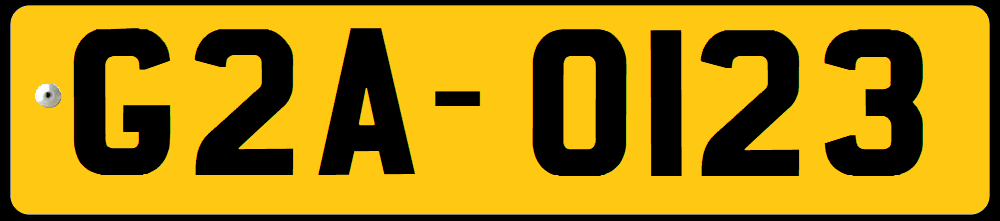
Gambian Commercial vehicle license plate, 1991 to 1994

=== 1994-1999 ===
The number plates in this series started with G3A. They had 4 digits. Private vehicle plates were Black on White background. Commercial plates were black on yellow background.

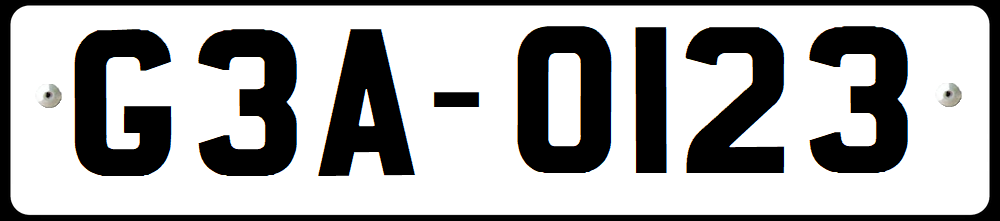
Gambian Passenger vehicle license plate, 1994 to 1999

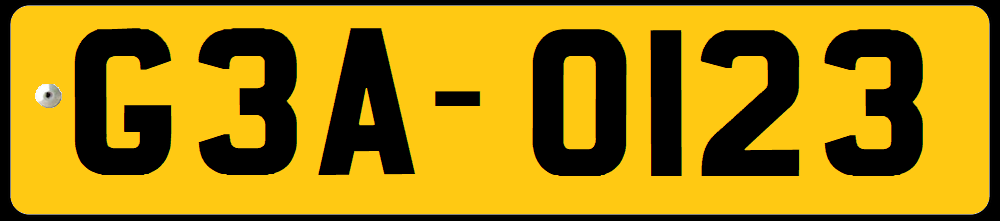
Gambian Commercial vehicle license plate, 1994 to 1999

== Diplomatic plates ==
Diplomatic plates are white-on-green. Three letters which denote the country or organization are followed by two numbers and 'CD'.

XXX 99 CD	XXX 99 CD
