= Vehicle registration plates of Grenada =

Grenada
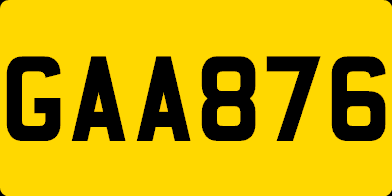
- Country: Grenada
- Country code: WG

Current series
- Slogan: None
- Size: 152 mm × 300 mm 6.0 in × 11.8 in
- Serial format: ABC123
- Colour (front): Black on yellow
- Colour (rear): Black on yellow
- Introduced: 2010; 16 years ago

History
- First issued: 1974; 52 years ago

The vehicle registration plates of Grenada use the North American standard 6 in × 12 in (152 mm × 300 mm) but use the typeface used on British plates. Rear plates have a yellow background and front ones white.

Image	First issued	Design	Slogan	Serial format	Serials issued	Notes
	1974	Orange on white porcelain	Grenada; 1974; Independence	1234		Grenada issued porcelain plates from 1971 to 1974. After 1974, new registrants used undated plates with either hand-painted numbers or had them made in the British style as was used before 1971.
	2010	Black on orange	None	ABC123		
