= Vehicle registration plates of the Mercosur =

Vehicle registration plates of the Mercosur are a system under implementation in the Mercosur member states, regional bloc and intergovernmental organization founded in 1991.

== History ==
During a meeting held in Foz do Iguaçu, Brazil, on 15 December 2010, a resolution was approved to unify the plate models of the then four countries belonging to the bloc: Argentina, Brazil, Paraguay and Uruguay. The initial planning foresaw implementation in up to 10 years, initially from 2016 for vehicles of load and of passengers that circulated beyond the borders.

At a followup meeting held in Buenos Aires on 8 October 2014, the representatives of the five member countries of the bloc (the four founders plus Venezuela) were presented the Mercosur slabs model, which was expected to start in 2016. Ultimately, the plan was delayed. The new plates are expected to come into effect in September 2018.

It is expected that the measure will reach a fleet of 110 million vehicles in the five countries and aims to facilitate traffic and road safety among the member countries of the bloc, as well as ensure the existence of a joint database.

== List ==
Vehicle registration plates of each Mercosur country are described in the following table:

Member state	Example	Implementation
Argentina		April 2016
Bolivia		AB 12345 From April 2017 for cars. only for international transport.
Brazil		2018: Amazonas, Bahia, Espírito Santo, Paraná, Rio de Janeiro, Rio Grande do Norte and Rio Grande do Sul. 2019: Piauí, Paraíba, Rondônia. 2020: Acre, Alagoas, Amapá, Ceará, Distrito Federal, Goiás, Maranhão, Mato Grosso, Mato Grosso do Sul, Minas Gerais, Pará, Pernambuco, Roraima, Santa Catarina, São Paulo, Sergipe, Tocantins
Paraguay		July 2019
Uruguay		March 2015
Venezuela		Suspended. Member state suspended "for breach of democratic order".

== See also ==
- Vehicle registration plates of Argentina
- Vehicle registration plates of Brazil
- Vehicle registration plates of Honduras
- Vehicle registration plates of Guatemala
- List of international vehicle registration codes
