= Vehicle registration plates of Honduras =

Republic of Honduras
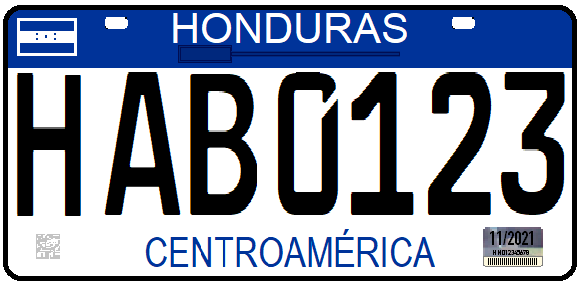
- Honduras private vehicle license plate, version since 2018
- Country: Honduras
- Country code: HN (no confirmation of the officiality of the code)

Current series
- Size: 520 mm × 110 mm 20.5 in × 4.3 in
- Colour (front): Black on white
- Colour (rear): Black on white

Vehicle registration plates of Honduras are issued by the Honduran Secretaría de Obras Públicas, Transporte y Vivienda (SOPTRAVI, Ministry of Public Works, Transport and Living) and identify motor vehicles in the country.

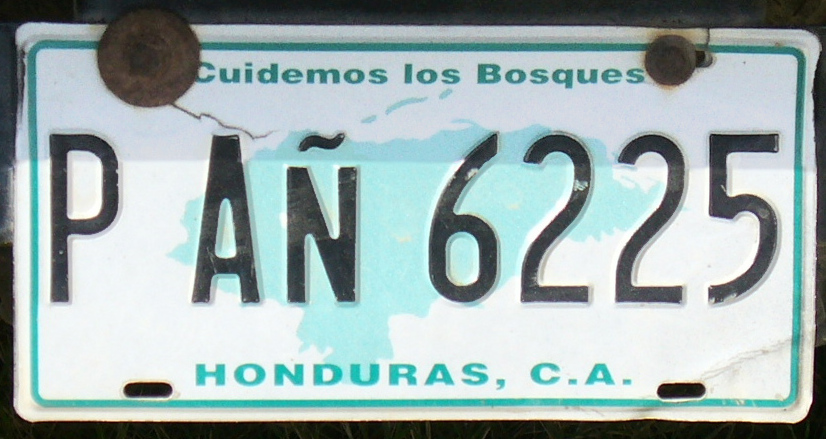
Honduras personal license plate using Ñ, old version

Honduran license plates are white and feature an outline of the map of Honduras in a variety of colors according to the class of vehicle registered. All license plates bear the slogan Cuidemos los Bosques ("Take Care of the Forests") along the top, and "Honduras, C.A." along the bottom. They are the same size as North American license plates, 6 by 12 inches.

The initial letter or (two letters) identify the class of vehicle (see table), followed by a four- or five-digit serial number. Personal, commercial and trailer tags also have a one- or two-letter serial letters. The letter Ñ is included in the alphabet used for the serial letters.

Type of plate	Serial Format	Color
Personal	P AB 1234	Green
Commercial	A AB 1234	Yellow
Diplomatic corps	CD 1234	
Consular corps	CC 1234	
International missions (aid agencies, etc.)	MI 1234	Red-purple
Government-owned vehicle	N 12345	Blue
Trailers	R A 1234	
Light trucks	PP 12345	Red

Light truck license plates in the PP format do not have the map of Honduras in the background.

== History ==
In October 2018, the Instituto de la Propiedad (IP) issued a new design of license plates (similar to those of Mercosur). The typeface used is FE-Schrift. It became available starting at the end of 2018. Types of license plates in motor vehicles will no longer be available, which allow exclusively use code H. The B code is used for motorcycles. It replaced the Cuidemos los Bosques ("Take Care of the Forests") lettering with Centro América ("Central America") lettering sited on the bottom while Honduras appears on the top corner. It is fitted with a QR code on the left bottom, black and a blue band at the top that shows the name of the country, and a sticker on the right bottom and windshield.

Neighboring Guatemala introduced a similar scheme in January 2021.

== See also ==
- Vehicle registration plates of Guatemala
- Vehicle registration plates of the Mercosur
