= Vehicle registration plates of Yemen =

Republic of Yemen
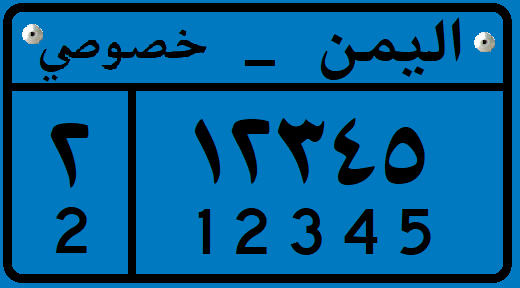
- For automobiles
- Country: Yemen

Vehicle registration plates of Yemen entered regular usage in 1993. The current version started in 2018 used FE-Schrift typeface for alphanumeric and Square Kufic typeface for Arabic text.

Yemeni license plate types can be distinguished by their background colour, as well as an Arabic text above the numerical code, adjacent to the country name, (اليمن).

The numerical section of the license plate is divided into 2, with a horizontal line. On the left, a 1 or 2-digit code, indicating the Governorate to which the vehicle belongs. This number will be between 1 and 22. On the right is the numerical identifier code for the vehicle, which can range between 1 and 6 digits.

== Plate formats (1993–present/2018 (in areas under control of the PLC)) ==
Vehicle types
Image	Type	Type in Arabic
	Private	خصوصي
	Vehicle for hire, bus, taxi	اجرة
	Vehicles used for transport of goods, Pick-up trucks, trucks, tractor trailers	نقل

=== Governorate codes ===
Vehicle types
Governorate	Code	Governorate	Code
Sanaa (City)	1	Lahij	12
Sanaa (Governorate)	2	Al Bayda	13
Aden	3	Al Mahwit	14
Taiz	4	Shabwah	15
Hadhramaut	5	Marib	16
Al Hudaydah	6	Al Mahrah	17
Ibb	7	Al Jawf	18
Hajjah	8	Amran	19
Dhamar	9	‌Dhale	20
Saada	10	Raymah	21
Abyan	11	Socotra	22

== South and East Yemen ==
Due to the ongoing conflict, political control in Yemen has fractured. This has had implications on vehicle registration plates. Most of the North, politically under the control of the Houthi-backed Supreme Political Council, has retained the aforementioned 1993 registration plate formats. However, in the South, the city of Aden, politically dominated by the UAE-backed Southern Transitional Council has developed a license plate design and format resembling those of UAE license plates. Most of the rest of Southern Yemen is politically controlled by the internationally-recognized legitimate Presidential Leadership Council. Individual provinces in the South have developed their own unique (but nevertheless similar is style and format) registration plates — used uniform FE-Schrift and Square Kufic typeface. (Note: Serif typeface unofficially used for alphanumeric alongside FE-Schrift.)

=== Aden City ===
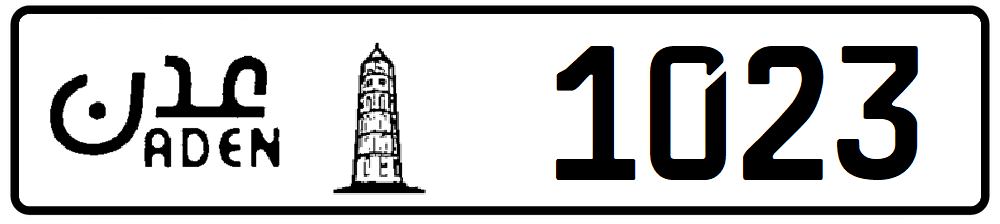
Typical 1-line license plate, having a size compliant with European standard (520 mm × 110 mm (20 in × 5 in)).

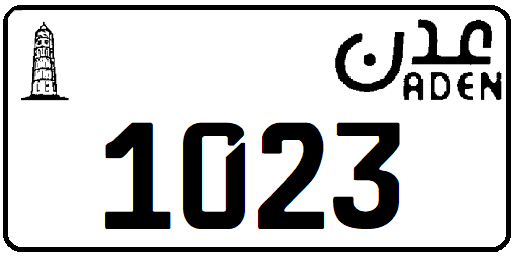
Typical 2-line license plate, installed on imported vehicles that can't accommodate a standard 1-line plate. Size compliant with American standard (335 mm × 170 mm (15 in × 5 in)).

Aden city, politically dominated by the UAE-backed Southern Movement, has started issuing license plates in formats resembling those of UAE license plates. The license plates feature a graphic of Ras Marshag Lighthouse, one of Aden's prominent landmarks, as well as a stylized Arabic Text saying "عدن" (Aden), as well as an English text saying Aden. The license plate currently consists of a 4-digit code, but is large enough to allow for 5, or 6-digit codes if need be. The license plate consists of black text and graphic and black boundary on white background. FE-Schrift typeface used for numerals.

=== Hadhramaut Governorate ===
Hadhramaut Governorate License Plates consist of black text and black boundary on white background. Hadramaout Governorate plates consist of the governorate name in Arabic (حضرموت) and a 4 digit number. Hadramaut Governorate plates also have a strip on the left hand side with the letter H in black on a background whose color depends on the classification of the vehicle. Temporary plates have a strip on the right hand side that says "مؤقت", meaning temporary, on a blue background. The license plates for Hadramout use a unique serif font.

Image	Type	Colour
	Private Vehicle	Blue
	Motorcycle	N/A
	Vehicle for hire (Taxis, Buses)	Yellow
	Commercial (Trucks, vans)	Red
	Governmental Vehicle	Green
	Temporary	Blue
	Police	Blue

=== Al Mahrah Governorate ===
Al Mahrah Governorate License Plates consist of black text and black boundary on white background. Hadramaout Governorate plates consist of the governorate name in Arabic (المهرة) and a 4 digit number. Al-Mahrah Governorate plates also have a strip on the left hand side with the letter M in black on a background whose color depends on the classification of the vehicle. Similar to Hadramout, The license plates for Al-Mahrah use a unique serif font.

The colour combination and structure of the license plates are similar to Hadramaout.

Image	Type	Colour
	Private Vehicle	Blue
	Motorcycle	N/A
	Vehicle for hire (Taxis, Buses)	Yellow
	Commercial (Trucks, vans)	Red
	Governmental Vehicle	Green

=== Marib Governorate ===
Marib Governorate License Plates consist of black numbers and black boundary on white background. Marib Governorate plates consist of the governorate name in Arabic (مأرب) and a 4 digit number. The governorate name is black on a background whose color depends on the classification of the vehicle. Marib Governorate plates also have a strip on the left hand side with the letter M in black on a background whose color matches the background color governorate name, and depends on the classification of the vehicle. The styles of Marib license plates thus differ from the previously mentioned southern governorates. The letter code used by the governorate, M, is the same as the letter code used by Al Mahrah Governorate. The license plates for Marib use a unique serif font.

Image	Type	Colour
	Private Vehicle	Blue
	Motorcycle	Yellow
	Vehicle for hire (Taxis, Buses)	Yellow
	Commercial (Trucks, vans)	Red

=== Shabwah Governorate ===
Starting from February 2020, Shabwah Governorate joined with Hadhramaut Governorate in issuing license plates in this new format and appearance. Similar to Hadhramaut, Shabwah License Plates consist of black text and black boundary on white background. Shabwah Governorate plates consist of the governorate name in Arabic (شبوة) and a 4 digit number. Shabwah Governorate plates also have a strip on the left hand side with the letter W in black on a background whose color depends on the classification of the vehicle. Temporary plates have a strip on the right hand side that says "مؤقت", meaning temporary, on a blue background. The license plates for Shabwah use a unique serif font.

Image	Type	Colour
	Private Vehicle	Blue
	Motorcycle	N/A
	Vehicle for hire (Taxis, Buses)	Yellow
	Commercial (Trucks, vans)	Red
	Governmental Vehicle	Green
	Temporary	Blue
	Police	Blue

=== Taiz Governorate ===
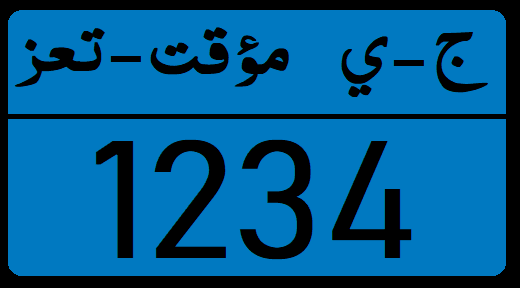
License plates for first class (private and for-hire vehicles) have black text and black borders on a blue background.

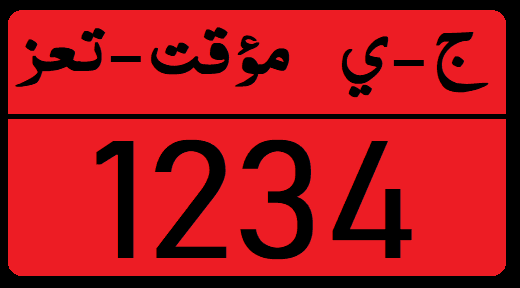
License plates for second class (commercial vehicles) have black text and black borders on a red background.

Unlike the aforementioned governorates, Taiz Governorate has not replaced the previous and other existing registration plates with a uniform new format like the rest of southern Yemen but uses the Mandatory typeface for numerals and Square Kufic for Arabic text since 2018. Taiz Governorate traffic police have introduced two classes of "Temporary" License plates for vehicles missing a license plate. It is unclear how long such temporary plates will remain in circulation and what format will replace them, but they are de facto the current license plate format issued by the governorate. Taiz temporary license plates have a top row that states "ج - ي" (J.Y.), standing for "Republic" and "Yemen" in Arabic. There is also the text "مؤقت - تعز", meaning "Temporary" and "Taiz", the name of the governorate.

There are two classes of "temporary" license plates:

- The first class is for private vehicles as well as for taxis and other for-hire vehicles. The plates for this class have black text and black borders on a blue background.
- The second class is for commercial vehicles, such as trucks and vans. The plates for this class have black text and black borders on a red background.
