= Mandatory (typeface) =

Typeface designed for vehicle licence plates

- Category: Sans-serif
- Also known as: Charles Wright 2001
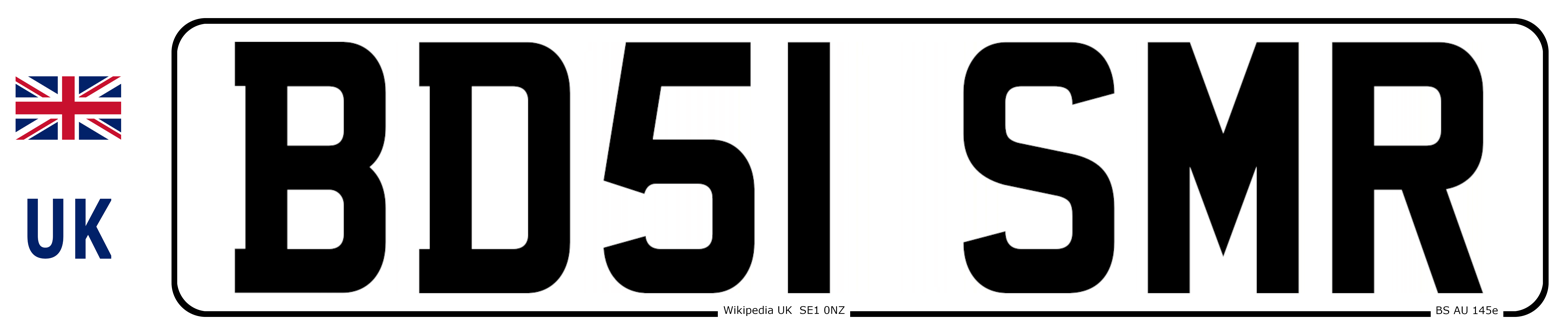
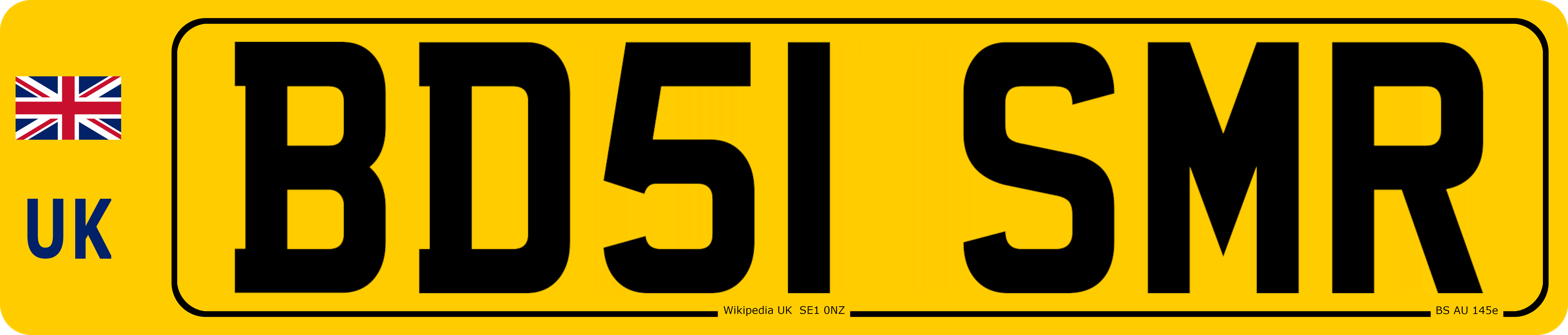
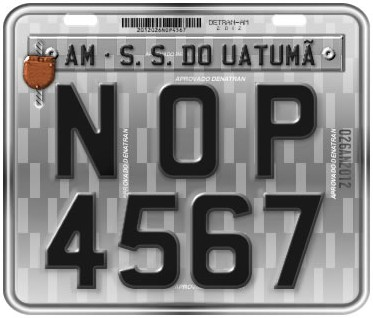
- Sample

Mandatory, also known as Charles Wright 2001, is a typeface developed from the Charles Wright typeface, introduced for use on vehicle registration plates of the United Kingdom. Its block letters and numbers are designed to prevent easy modification and to improve legibility, with stroke separation on the M and W which are pointed at the centre, and the tail of the Q which is thinner and clearer. It was developed in the United Kingdom and is also used by Brazil (where it was mandatory from 2008 to 2018—prior to the adoption of Mercosur plates), Commonwealth countries, Jordan, and Yemen (Taiz Governorate) for numerals since 2018.

In the United Kingdom, characters on vehicle registration plates purchased from 1 September 2001 must use Mandatory typeface and conform to set specifications as to width, height, stroke, spacing and margins. The physical characteristics of the number plates are set out in British Standard BS AU 145e (or BS AU 145d for plates fitted before 1 September 2021), which specifies visibility, strength, and reflectivity.

== See also ==
- FE-Schrift
