= Vehicle registration plates of Guatemala =

Republic of Guatemala
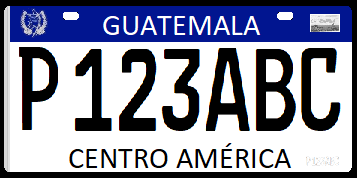
- Country: Guatemala
- Country code: GCA

Current series
- Slogan: Centro América
- Size: 6 in × 12 in 150 mm × 300 mm
- Introduced: 2021; 5 years ago

History
- First issued: 1988; 38 years ago

Guatemala requires its residents to register their motor vehicles and display vehicle registration plates. Current plates are North American standard 6 in × 12 in (152 mm × 300 mm).

== History ==
In January 2021, Guatemala introduced a new license plate, similar to those of Mercosur, as well as neighboring Honduras. The typeface used is FE-Schrift.

== Types ==
Guatemala uses the same format for all types, 123ABC, with a prefix at the start to show the vehicle class. P is for passenger vehicles and is the most common type. C is for commercial vehicles.

Image	First issued	Design	Slogan	Serial format	Serials issued	Notes
	1988	Blue on white	Centro América	A123456		
	2021	Black on white	Centro América	A123ABC	P001JAA-?	Printed flat in some jurisdictions

== See also ==
- Vehicle registration plates of Honduras
- Vehicle registration plates of the Mercosur
