= Vehicle registration plates of Brazil =

Federative Republic of Brazil
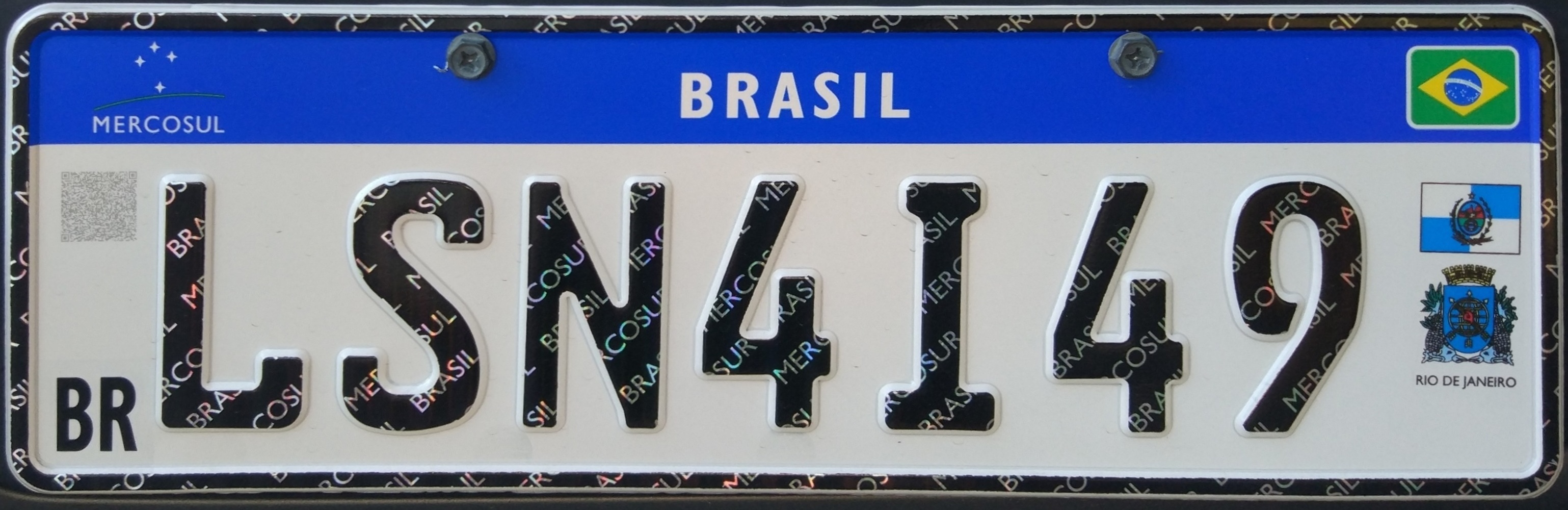
- Brazilian vehicle license plate for a private-use vehicle registered in Rio de Janeiro, RJ. Mercosur-style plates were introduced in September 2018.
- Country: Brazil
- Country code: BR

Current series
- Size: 400 mm × 130 mm 15.7 in × 5.1 in
- Serial format: ABC1234
- Colour (front): Black on white
- Colour (rear): Black on white

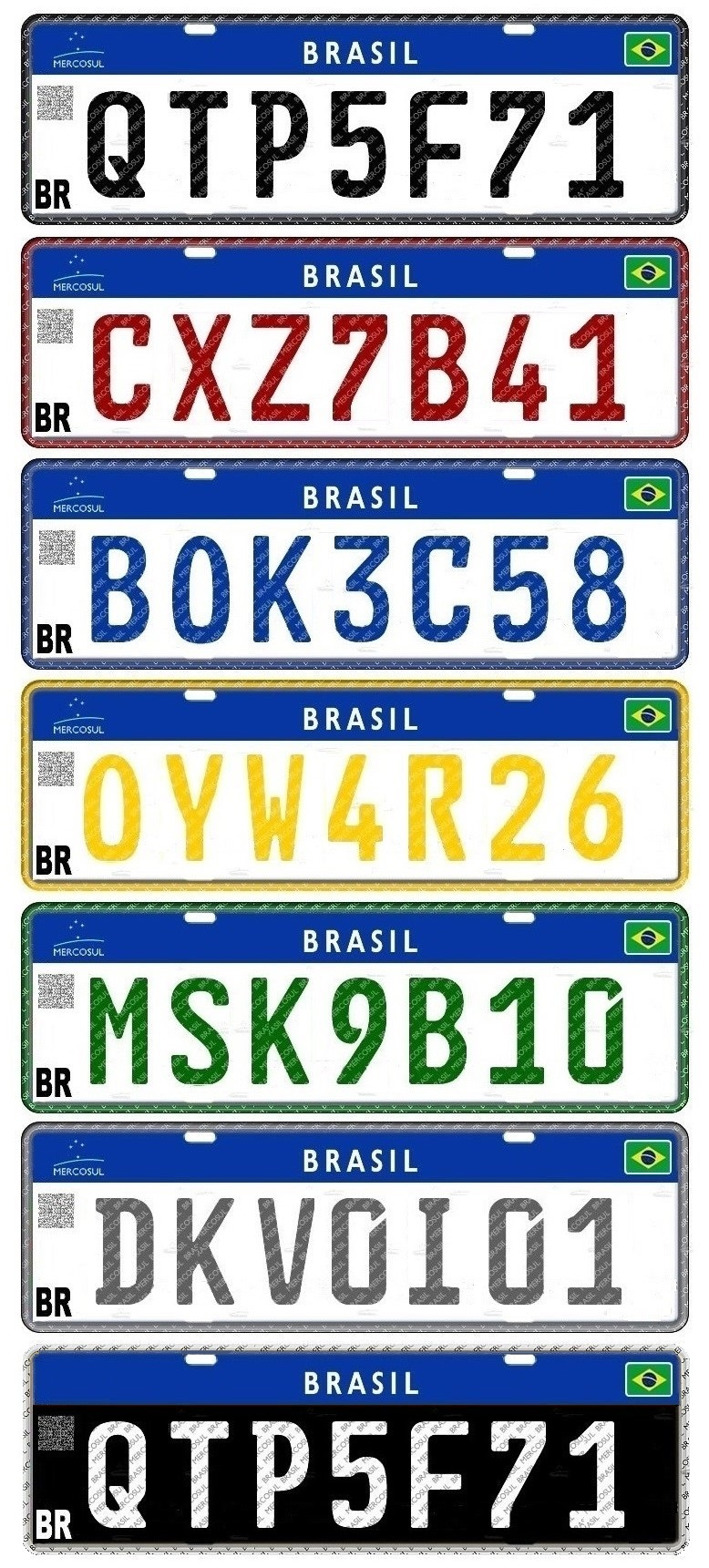
Colour schemes denoting functions used in Brazilian license plates, current style

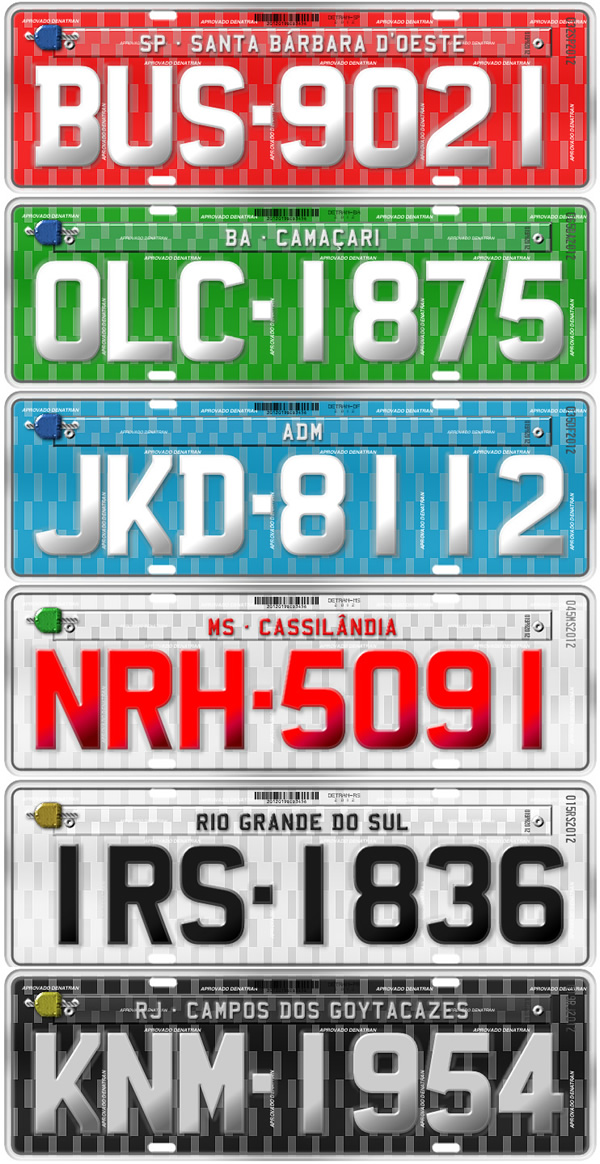
Colour schemes denoting functions used in Brazilian license plates in the style that lasted from 1990 to 2018

Brazilian vehicle registration plates are issued by the states. Each state has a Departamento de Trânsito (DETRAN) that is in charge of vehicle registration and car tax collection, but plates are standardized across the country and form a national vehicle registration database.

== Description ==
The current system, being phased out in favor of Mercosul standard plates, was created in 1990 and was named Registro Nacional de Veículos Automotores (RENAVAM). It uses the form "LLL·NNNN", where LLL is a three-letter combination followed by a four-digit number with a dot between the letters and numbers. A combination given to one vehicle stays with it "for life" - it cannot be changed or transferred to another vehicle. Vanity plates are allowed as long as they abide by the same standard as non-vanity plates.

Above the combination is a metallic band with the standardized state abbreviation and the name of the municipality in which the vehicle is currently registered. This band has to be changed when a vehicle needs to be registered in a different municipality. Rear number plates are bound to the vehicle by a plastic seal. Broken seals invalidate the number plate, which has to be re-sealed by the authorities. Seals need to be broken in order to change State/Municipality tags.

The size of the Brazilian license plates has been standardized to 400 × 130 mm (15" × 5" approx.) in 2008. That standardization also requires a unique typeface known as "Mandatory", which is similar to the typeface used on British plates introduced there in 2001. Plates in North American standard or European standard size can no longer be used as of 1 January 2008.

== Colors ==
=== Mercosur license plates (2018–) ===
- Black on white: privately owned vehicles;
- Red on white: any kind of paid transportation (buses, taxis, trucks, etc.) and driving schools (autoescola in Portuguese);
- Blue on white: official use (government-owned cars: police departments, fire departments, federal, state or city public services);
- Grey on white: collector's items (vehicles older than 30 years in excellent state of conservation and in original state - with more than 80% of its original components), unrestricted circulation inside and outside Brazil;
- White on black: same as above, but without Mercosur's logo and with circulation restricted inside Brazil;
- Green on white: manufacturer plates for vehicles under testing, dealer-testing, or in some cases test-drive (in most cases test-drive cars are registered to the dealership and thus use regular black on white plates; privately owned cars being tested after repairs usually carry dealer-fitted green plates over their black on white plates);
- Gold on white: diplomatic use.

=== Old system (1990–2018) ===
- Black on grey: privately owned vehicles;
- White on red: any kind of paid transportation (buses, taxis etc.);
- Red on white: driving school (autoescola in Portuguese);
- Black on white: official use (government-owned cars: police departments, fire departments, federal, state or city public services);
- Gray on black: collector's items (vehicles older than 30 years in excellent state of conservation and in original state - with more than 80% of its original components);
- White on green: manufacturer plates for vehicles under testing, dealer-testing, or in some cases test-drive (in most cases test-drive cars are registered to the dealership and thus use black on grey plates; privately owned cars being tested after repairs usually carry dealer-fitted green plates over their black on grey plates);
- White on blue: diplomatic use (in this case in the format CD 1234 or CC 1234) or newer licenses like EMB 1234).
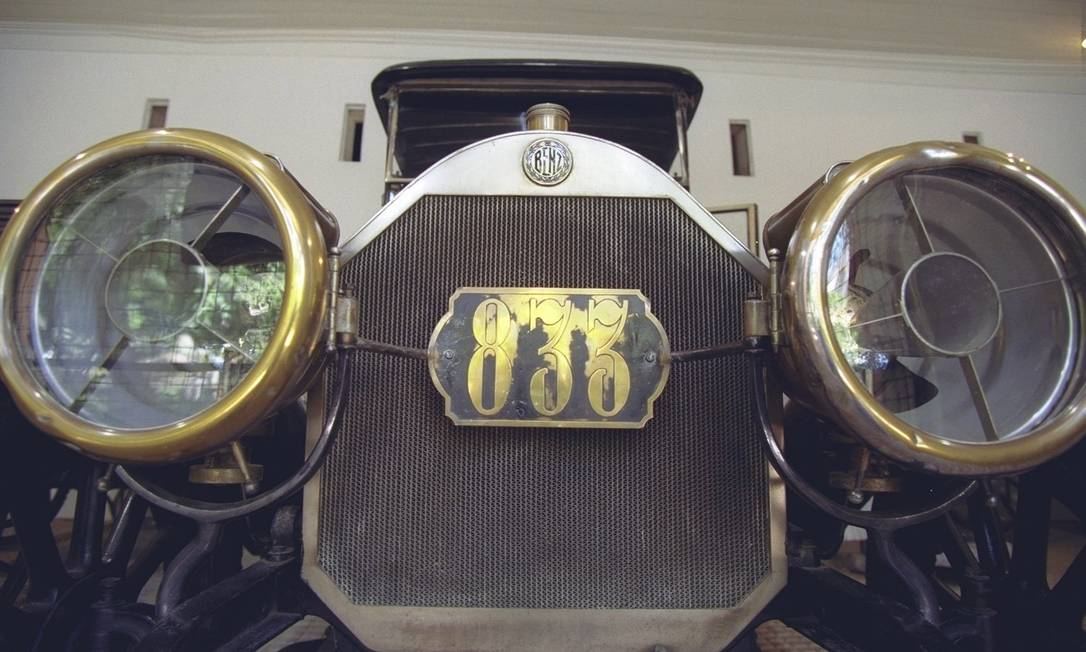
The first Brazilian license plate was issued in 1901. The early model of the plates was used until 1913

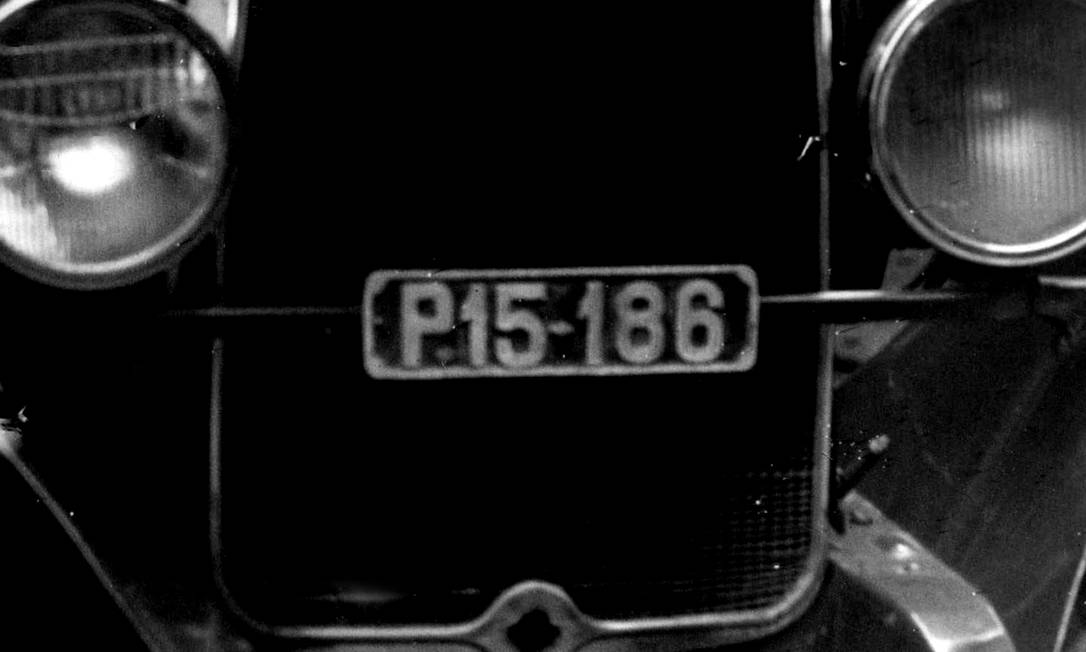
Brazilian license plate used between 1915 and 1941, always beginning with the letter P (private) or A (cabs, trucks and buses)

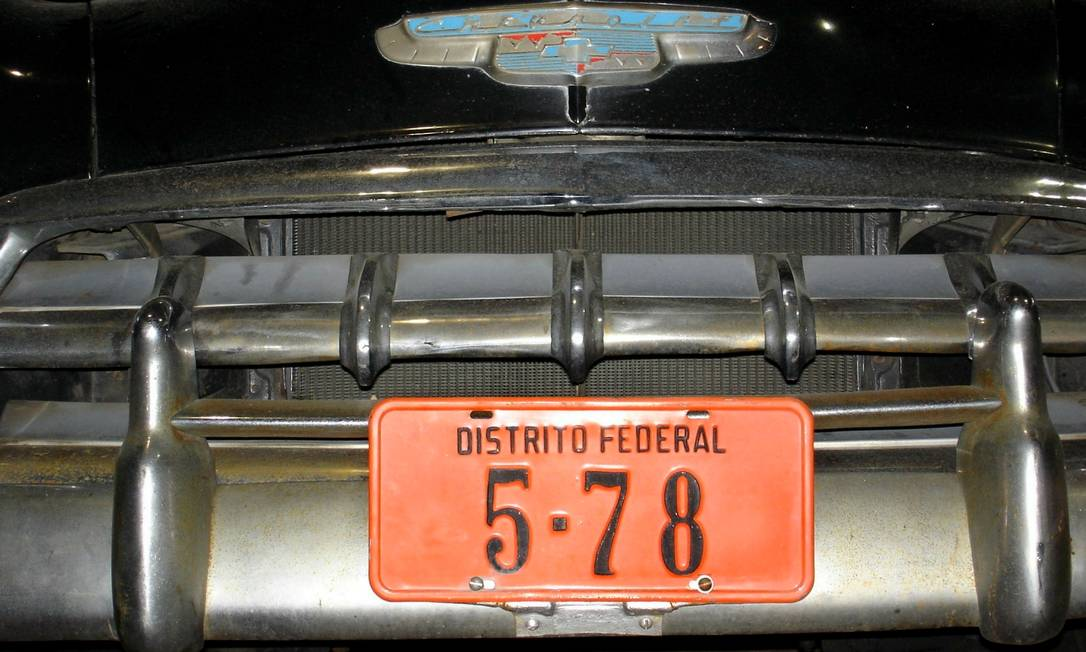
License plate model used in Brazil between 1941 and 1970. The "Distrito Federal" tag was used in Rio de Janeiro city until 1960, when Brasília became the country's capital and federal district

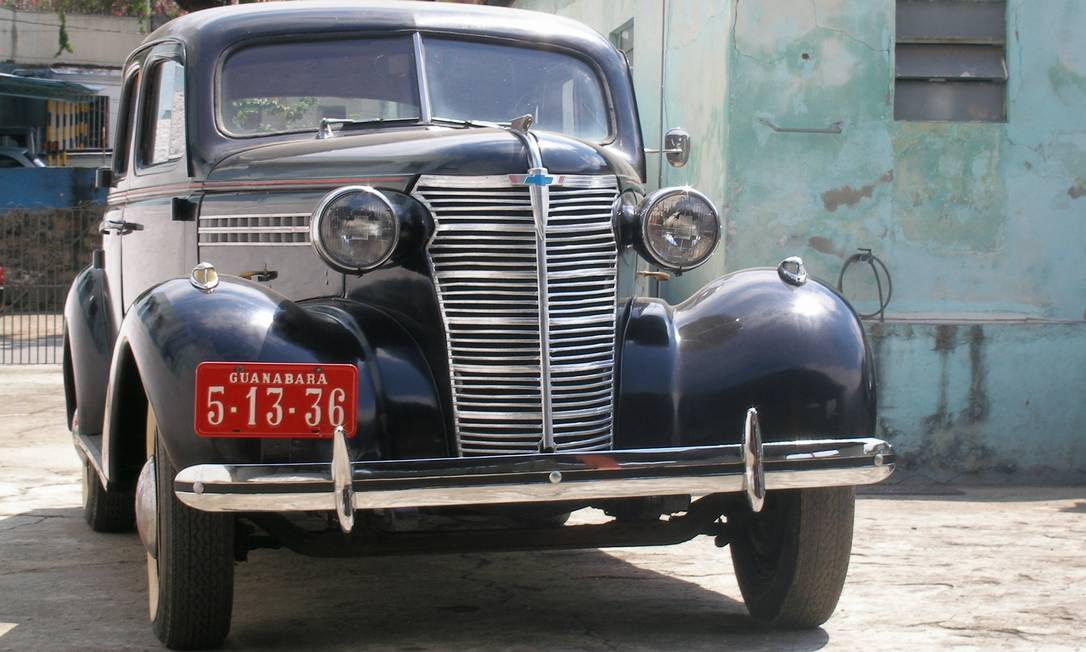
Cab - truck - bus license plate used in Brazil between 1941 and 1970. The name "Guanabara" began to be used in Rio de Janeiro city in 1960, referring to the city-state where it belonged until 1975, when it was merged with state of Rio de Janeiro and became its capital

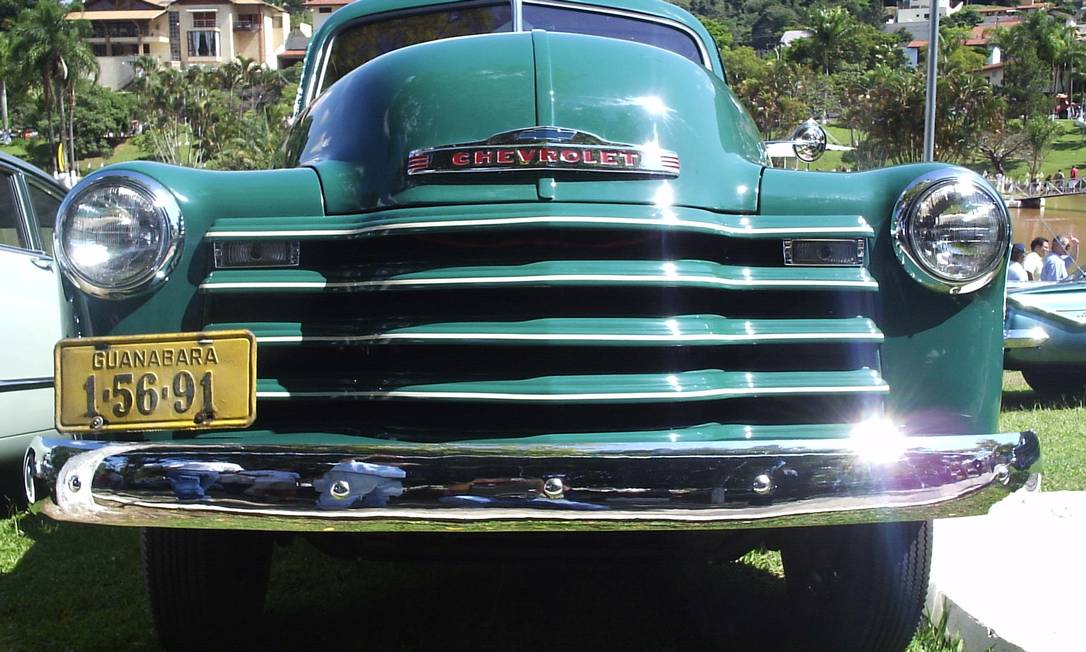
Private license plate model used in Rio de Janeiro city, Brazil, between 1941 and 1970. The name "Guanabara" began to be used in Rio de Janeiro city in 1960

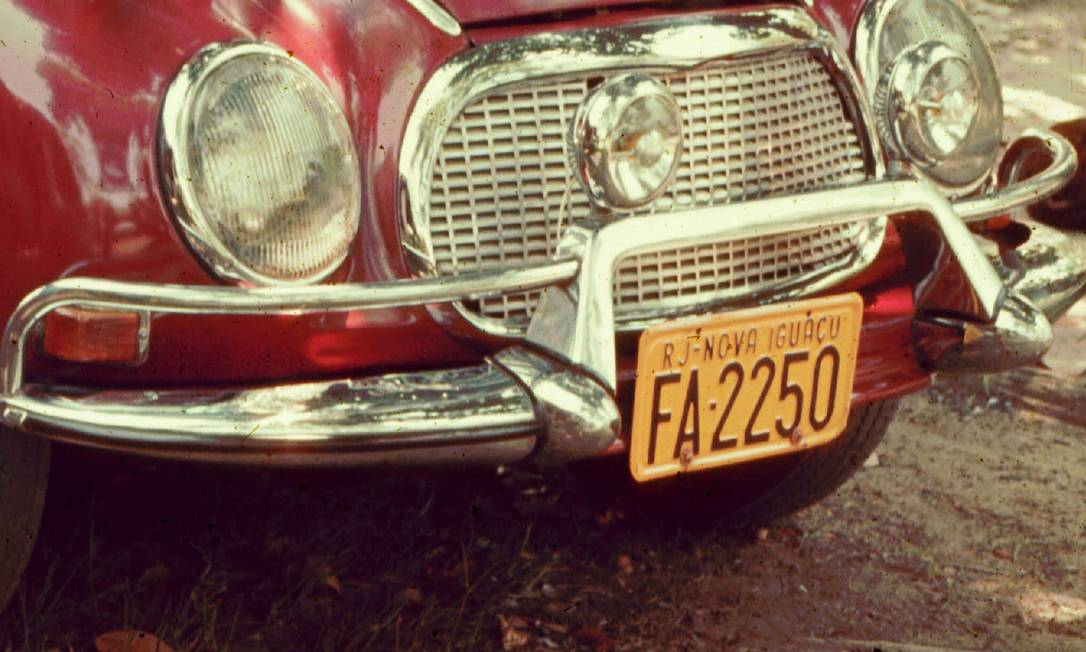
Brazilian yellow alphanumeric plate used in private cars between 1971 and 1990

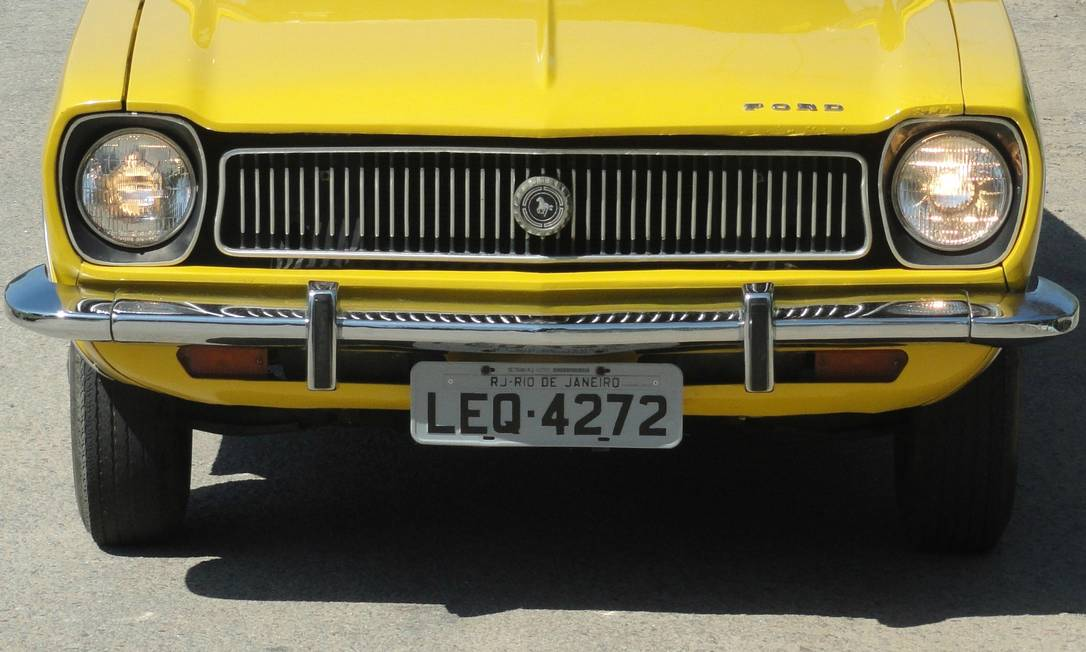
Brazilian license plate used from 1990 until the exchange for Mercosur plates

== Sequences ==
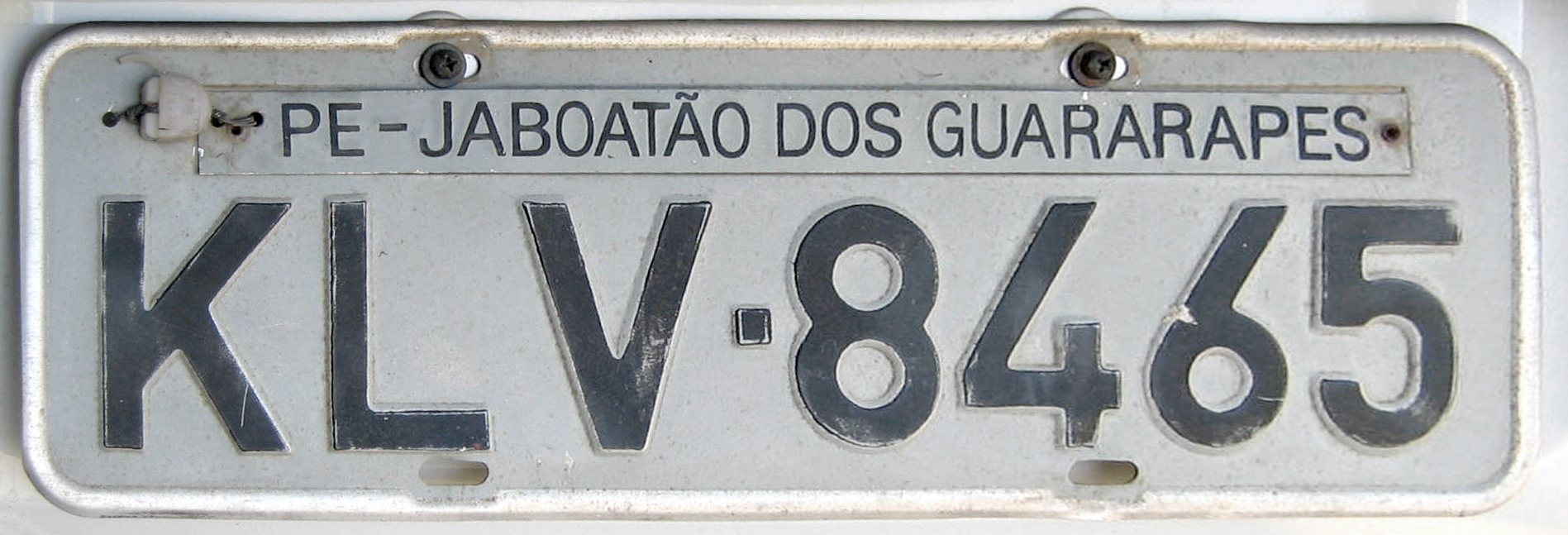
Rear plate from Pernambuco

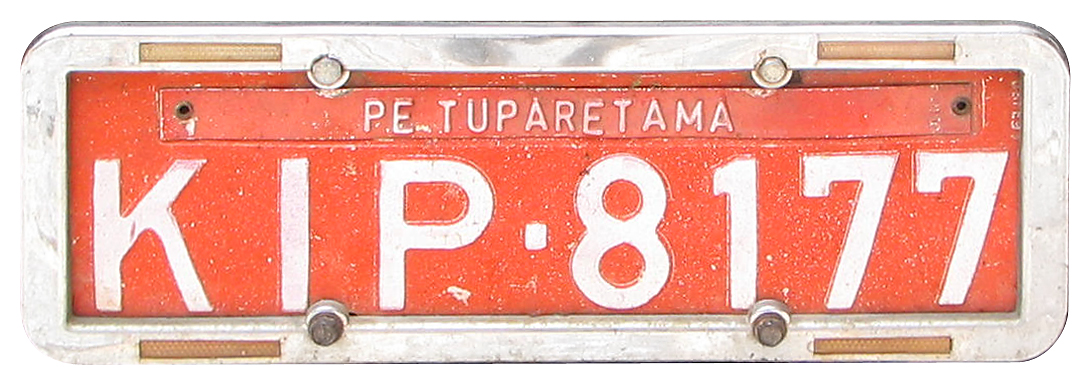
Front license plate of a truck from Pernambuco

=== Vertical Distribution of Alphanumeric Combinations ===
The letters on the license plate can describe the state where a vehicle was originally registered. Vehicles transferred from one state to another will display the new state/municipality on the temporary plate, but it is always possible to determine the original registration location of a used vehicle by observing the letter sequence on the plate for each Brazilian state.:

State	1st sequence	2nd sequence	3rd sequence	4th sequence	5th sequence	6th sequence	7th sequence	8th sequence	9th sequence	10th sequence	11th sequence	12th sequence	13th sequence	14th sequence	15th sequence	16th sequence	17th sequence	18th sequence
Paraná (PR)	AAA to BEZ	RHA to RHZ	SDP to SFO	TAI to TBZ	UAS to UCZ													
São Paulo (SP)	BFA to GKI	SAV 0A01 to 1A00	QSN to QSZ	SSR to SWZ	TIO to TMJ	UDA to UGV												
Minas Gerais (MG)	GKJ to HOK	NXX to NYG	OLO to OMH	OOV to ORC	OWH to OXK	PUA to PZZ	QMQ to QQZ	QUA to QUZ	QWR to QXZ	RFA to RGD	RMD to RNZ	RTA to RVZ	SHB to SJI	SYA to SYZ	UAI	TCA to TEZ	TWY to UAH	
Maranhão (MA)	HOL to HQE	NHA to NHT	NMP to NNI	NWS to NXQ	OIR to OJQ	OXQ to OXZ	PSA to PTZ	ROA to ROZ	SMM to SNJ	UJM to UJZ								
Mato Grosso do Sul (MS)	HQF to HTW	NRF to NSD	OOG to OOU	QAA to QAZ	REW to REZ	RWA to RWJ	SLW to SML											
Ceará (CE)	HTX to HZA	NQL to NRE	NUM to NVF	OCB to OCU	OHX to OIQ	ORN to OSV	OZA	PMA to POZ	RIA to RIL	SAN to SAU	SAV 1A01 to SBV	THN a TIN						
Sergipe (SE)	HZB to IAP	NVG to NVN	OEJ to OES	OZB	QKN to QKZ	QMA to QMP	RQW to RRH	TNU to TOD										
Rio Grande do Sul (RS)	IAQ to JDO	TQO to TRW																
Distrito Federal (DF)	JDP to JKR	OVM to OVV	OZW to PBZ	REC to REV	SGN to SGZ	SSF to SSQ	TUY to TUZ	TVK	UIV to UJL									
Bahia (BA)	JKS to JSZ	NTD to NTW	NYH to NZZ	OKI to OLG	OUF to OVD	OZC to OZV	PJA to PLZ	QTU to QTZ	RCO to RDR	RPA to RPZ	SJJ to SKT	TGR to THH	TMK to TNG					
Pará (PA)	JTA to JWE	NSE to NTC	OBT to OCA	OFI to OFW	OSW to OTZ	QDA to QEZ	QVA to QVZ	RWK to RXJ	SZA to SZZ	TVL to TWK								
Amazonas (AM)	JWF to JXY	NOI to NPB	OAA to OAO	OXM	PHA to PHZ	QZA to QZZ	TAA to TAH	TRX to TSO										
Mato Grosso (MT)	JXZ to KAU	NIY to NJW	NPC to NPQ	NTX to NUG	OAP to OBS	QBA to QCZ	RAK to RAZ	RRI to RRZ	SPC to SQP									
Goiás (GO)	KAV to KFC	NFC to NGZ	NJX to NLU	NVO to NWR	OGH to OHA	OMI to OOF	PQA to PRZ	QTN to QTS	RBK to RCN	SBW to SDO	TFA to TGN							
Pernambuco (PE)	KFD to KME	NXU to NXW	PEE to PFQ	PFR to PGK	PGL to PGU	OYL to OYZ	PCA to PED	PGV to PGZ	QYA to QYZ	RZE to RZZ	SNK to SPB	UHJ to UII						
Rio de Janeiro (RJ)	KMF to LVE	RIO	RIP to RKV	SQV to SSE	TTA to TUX													
Piauí (PI)	LVF to LWQ	NHU to NIX	ODU to OEI	OUA to OUE	OVW to OVY	PIA to PIZ	QRN to QRZ	RSG to RST	SLM to SLV	UKF to UKN								
Santa Catarina (SC)	LWR to MMM	OKD to OKH	QHA to QJZ	QTK to QTM	RAA to RAJ	RDS to REB	RKW to RLP	RXK to RYZ	SXA to SXZ	TPI to TQE								
Paraíba (PB)	MMN to MOW	NPR to NQK	OET to OFH	OFX to OGG	OXO	QFA to QFZ	QSA to QSM	RLQ to RLZ	SKU to SLF	TOT to TPH								
Espírito Santo (ES)	MOX to MTZ	OCV to ODT	OVE to OVF	OVH to OVL	OYD to OYK	PPA to PPZ	QRB to QRM	RBA to RBJ	RQM to RQV	SFP to SGM	TOE to TOS							
Alagoas (AL)	MUA to MVK	NLV to NMO	OHB to OHK	ORD to ORM	OXN	QLA to QLM	QTT	QWG to QWL	RGO to RGU	SAA to SAJ	RGV to RGZ	TNH to TNT						
Tocantins (TO)	MVL to MXG	OLH to OLN	OYA to OYC	QKA to QKM	QWA to QWF	RSA to RSF	RIM to RIN	RMA to RMC	TVA to TVD									
Rio Grande do Norte (RN)	MXH to MZM	NNJ to NOH	OJR to OKC	OVZ to OWG	QGA to QGZ	RGN	RGE to RGM	RQA to RQL	TSP to TSZ									
Acre (AC)	MZN to NAG	NXR to NXT	OVG	OXP	QLU to QLZ	QWM to QWQ	SHA	SQQ to SQU										
Roraima (RR)	NAH to NBA	NUH to NUL	RZA to RZD															
Rondônia (RO)	NBB to NEH	OHL to OHW	OXL	QRA	QTA to QTJ	RSU to RSZ	SLG to SLL	THI to THM	UAJ to UAR									
Amapá (AP)	NEI to NFB	QLN to QLT	SAK to SAM	TGO to TGQ	UKO to UKQ													

=== Vertical distribution of sequences in alphabetical order ===
Below is an alphabetically organized list of Letter Sequences and corresponding States. This list is up to date as of January 2026.

Letter combination	State	Sequence	Used since
AAA to BEZ	Paraná	1.ª	02/1990
BFA to GKI	São Paulo	1.ª	07/1991
GKJ to HOK	Minas Gerais	1.ª	09/1991
HOL to HQE	Maranhão	1.ª	01/1992
HQF to HTW	Mato Grosso do Sul	1.ª	03/1992
HTX to HZA	Ceará	1.ª	10/1992
HZB to IAP	Sergipe	1.ª	09/1993
IAQ to JDO	Rio Grande do Sul	1.ª	03/1992
JDP to JKR	Distrito Federal	1.ª	04/1994
JKS to JSZ	Bahia	1.ª	08/1993
JTA to JWE	Pará	1.ª	07/1993
JWF to JXY	Amazonas	1.ª	09/1993
JXZ to KAU	Mato Grosso	1.ª	09/1993
KAV to KFC	Goiás	1.ª	05/1994
KFD to KME	Pernambuco	1.ª	08/1994
KMF to LVE	Rio de Janeiro	1.ª	05/1994
LVF to LWQ	Piauí	1.ª	04/1994
LWR to MMM	Santa Catarina	1.ª	06/1996
MMN to MOW	Paraíba	1.ª	07/1996
MOX to MTZ	Espírito Santo	1.ª	12/1995
MUA to MVK	Alagoas	1.ª	08/1996
MVL to MXG	Tocantins	1.ª	11/1996
MXH to MZM	Rio Grande do Norte	1.ª	06/1998
MZN to NAG	Acre	1.ª	06/1998
NAH to NBA	Roraima	1.ª	07/1998
NBB to NEH	Rondônia	1.ª	07/1998
NEI to NFB	Amapá	1.ª	09/1998
NFC to NGZ	Goiás	2.ª	08/2003
NHA to NHT	Maranhão	2.ª	12/2006
NHU to NIX	Piauí	2.ª	05/2007
NIY to NJW	Mato Grosso	2.ª	10/2007
NJX to NLU	Goiás	3.ª	11/2007
NLV to NMO	Alagoas	2.ª	01/2008
NMP to NNI	Maranhão	3.ª	05/2008
NNJ to NOH	Rio Grande do Norte	2.ª	07/2008
NOI to NPB	Amazonas	2.ª	07/2008
NPC to NPQ	Mato Grosso	3.ª	09/2008
NPR to NQK	Paraíba	2.ª	11/2008
NQL to NRE	Ceará	2.ª	12/2008
NRF to NSD	Mato Grosso do Sul	2.ª	11/2009
NSE to NTC	Pará	2.ª	11/2009
NTD to NTW	Bahia	2.ª	02/2010
NTX to NUG	Mato Grosso	4.ª	03/2010
NUH to NUL	Roraima	2.ª	06/2010
NUM to NVF	Ceará	3.ª	06/2010
NVG to NVN	Sergipe	2.ª	03/2010
NVO to NWR	Goiás	4.ª	03/2010
NWS to NXQ	Maranhão	4.ª	07/2010
NXR to NXT	Acre	2.ª	05/2011
NXU to NXW	Pernambuco	2.ª	07/2010
NXX to NYG	Minas Gerais	2.ª	10/2011
NYH to NZZ	Bahia	3.ª	10/2010
OAA to OAO	Amazonas	3.ª	12/2010
OAP to OBS	Mato Grosso	5.ª	05/2011
OBT to OCA	Pará	3.ª	07/2011
OCB to OCU	Ceará	4.ª	02/2011
OCV to ODT	Espírito Santo	2.ª	05/2011
ODU to OEI	Piauí	3.ª	09/2011
OEJ to OES	Sergipe	3.ª	08/2011
OET to OFH	Paraíba	3.ª	04/2011
OFI to OFW	Pará	4.ª	03/2011
OFX to OGG	Paraíba	4.ª	06/2011
OGH to OHA	Goiás	5.ª	04/2011
OHB to OHK	Alagoas	3.ª	09/2011
OHL to OHW	Rondônia	2.ª	11/2011
OHX to OIQ	Ceará	5.ª	12/2011
OIR to OJQ	Maranhão	5.ª	01/2012
OJR to OKC	Rio Grande do Norte	3.ª	04/2012
OKD to OKH	Santa Catarina	2.ª	02/2014
OKI to OLG	Bahia	4.ª	10/2011
OLH to OLN	Tocantins	2.ª	02/2012
OLO to OMH	Minas Gerais	3.ª	03/2012
OMI to OOF	Goiás	6.ª	04/2012
OOG to OOU	Mato Grosso do Sul	3.ª	02/2012
OOV to ORC	Minas Gerais	4.ª	06/2012
ORD to ORM	Alagoas	4.ª	01/2012
ORN to OSV	Ceará	6.ª	07/2012
OSW to OTZ	Pará	5.ª	08/2012
OUA to OUE	Piauí	4.ª	11/2012
OUF to OVD	Bahia	5.ª	12/2012
OVE to OVF	Espírito Santo	3.ª	12/2012
OVG	Acre	3.ª	05/2013
OVH to OVL	Espírito Santo	4.ª	07/2013
OVM to OVV	Distrito Federal	2.ª	11/2013
OVW to OVY	Piauí	5.ª	10/2013
OVZ to OWG	Rio Grande do Norte	4.ª	06/2013
OWH to OXK	Minas Gerais	5.ª	10/2013
OXL	Rondônia	3.ª	11/2013
OXM	Amazonas	4.ª	11/2013
OXN	Alagoas	5.ª	11/2013
OXO	Paraíba	5.ª	11/2013
OXP	Acre	4.ª	12/2013
OXQ to OXZ	Maranhão	6.ª	04/2014
OYA to OYC	Tocantins	3.ª	11/2013
OYD to OYK	Espírito Santo	5.ª	12/2013
OYL to OYZ	Pernambuco	6.ª	02/2014
OZA	Ceará	7.ª	01/2014
OZB	Sergipe	4.ª	01/2014
OZC to OZV	Bahia	6.ª	03/2014
OZW to PBZ	Distrito Federal	3.ª	05/2014
PCA to PED	Pernambuco	7.ª	12/2014
PEE to PFQ	Pernambuco	3.ª	09/2010
PFR to PGK	Pernambuco	4.ª	07/2012
PGL to PGU	Pernambuco	5.ª	10/2013
PGV to PGZ	Pernambuco	8.ª	12/2014
PHA to PHZ	Amazonas	5.ª	06/2014
PIA to PIZ	Piauí	6.ª	06/2014
PJA to PLZ	Bahia	7.ª	10/2014
PMA to POZ	Ceará	8.ª	06/2014
PPA to PPZ	Espírito Santo	6.ª	08/2014
PQA to PRZ	Goiás	7.ª	03/2015
PSA to PTZ	Maranhão	7.ª	12/2014
PUA to PZZ	Minas Gerais	6.ª	05/2014
QAA to QAZ	Mato Grosso do Sul	4.ª	12/2014
QBA to QCZ	Mato Grosso	6.ª	05/2014
QDA to QEZ	Pará	6.ª	10/2014
QFA to QFZ	Paraíba	6.ª	05/2014
QGA to QGZ	Rio Grande do Norte	5.ª	09/2014
QHA to QJZ	Santa Catarina	3.ª	05/2014
QKA to QKM	Tocantins	4.ª	11/2014
QKN to QKZ	Sergipe	5.ª	06/2014
QLA to QLM	Alagoas	6.ª	09/2015
QLN to QLT	Amapá	2.ª	01/2015
QLU to QLZ	Acre	5.ª	08/2014
QMA to QMP	Sergipe	6.ª	03/2017
QMQ to QQZ	Minas Gerais	7.ª	07/2017
QRA	Rondônia	4.ª	11/2017
QRB to QRM	Espírito Santo	7.ª	05/2018
QRN to QRZ	Piauí	7.ª	10/2018
QSA to QSM	Paraíba	7.ª	04/2018
QSN to QSZ	São Paulo	3.ª	11/2018
QTA to QTJ	Rondônia	5.ª	08/2018
QTK to QTM	Santa Catarina	4.ª	11/2018
QTN to QTS	Goiás	8.ª	08/2019
QTT	Alagoas	7.ª	02/2019
QTU to QTZ	Bahia	8.ª	09/2019
QUA to QUZ	Minas Gerais	8.ª	06/2019
QVA to QVZ	Pará	7.ª	04/2019
QWA to QWF	Tocantins	5.ª	05/2019
QWG to QWL	Alagoas	8.ª	06/2019
QWM to QWQ	Acre	6.ª	08/2019
QWR to QXZ	Minas Gerais	9.ª	10/2019
QYA to QYZ	Pernambuco	9.ª	07/2019
QZA to QZZ	Amazonas	6.ª	08/2019
RAA to RAJ	Santa Catarina	5.ª	08/2019
RAK to RAZ	Mato Grosso	7.ª	11/2019
RBA to RBJ	Espírito Santo	8ª	03/2020
RBK to RCN	Goiás	9.ª	11/2019
RCO to RDR	Bahia	9.ª	12/2019
RDS to REB	Santa Catarina	6.ª	01/2020
REC to REV	Distrito Federal	4.ª	02/2020
REW to REZ	Mato Grosso do Sul	5.ª	05/2021
RFA to RGD	Minas Gerais	10.ª	05/2020
RGE to RGM	Rio Grande do Norte	7.ª	03/2020
RGN	Rio Grande do Norte	6.ª	12/2018
RGO to RGU	Alagoas	9.ª	08/2020
RGV to RGZ	Alagoas	11.ª	10/2023
RHA to RHZ	Paraná	2.ª	09/2020
RIA to RIL	Ceará	9.ª	02/2021
RIM to RIN	Tocantins	7.ª	11/2022
RIO	Rio de Janeiro	2.ª	09/2018
RIP to RKV	Rio de Janeiro	3.ª	01/2020
RKW to RLP	Santa Catarina	7.ª	09/2020
RLQ to RLZ	Paraíba	8.ª	10/2020
RMA to RMC	Tocantins	8.ª	09/2023
RMD to RNZ	Minas Gerais	11.ª	12/2020
ROA to ROZ	Maranhão	8.ª	03/2021
RPA to RPZ	Bahia	10.ª	12/2021
RQA to RQL	Rio Grande do Norte	8.ª	06/2022
RQM to RQV	Espírito Santo	9.ª	03/2021
RQW to RRH	Sergipe	7.ª	11/2021
RRI to RRZ	Mato Grosso	8.ª	11/2021
RSA to RSF	Tocantins	6.ª	03/2021
RSG to RST	Piauí	8.ª	09/2021
RSU to RSZ	Rondônia	6.ª	07/2021
RTA to RVZ	Minas Gerais	12.ª	10/2021
RWA to RWJ	Mato Grosso do Sul	6.ª	12/2021
RWK to RXJ	Pará	8.ª	11/2021
RXK to RYZ	Santa Catarina	8.ª	09/2021
RZA to RZD	Roraima	3.ª	09/2021
RZE to RZZ	Pernambuco	10.ª	09/2021
SAA to SAJ	Alagoas	10.ª	12/2021
SAK to SAM	Amapá	3.ª	11/2021
SAN to SAU	Ceará	10.ª	12/2021
SAV 0A01 a 1A00	São Paulo	2.ª	09/2009
SAV 1A01 to SBV	Ceará	11.ª	12/2021
SBW to SDO	Goiás	10.ª	02/2022
SDP to SFO	Paraná	3.ª	03/2022
SFP to SGM	Espírito Santo	10.ª	07/2022
SGN to SGZ	Distrito Federal	5.ª	07/2022
SHA	Acre	7.ª	06/2022
SHB to SJI	Minas Gerais	13.ª	07/2022
SJJ to SKT	Bahia	11.ª	08/2023
SKU to SLF	Paraíba	9.ª	10/2022
SLG to SLL	Rondônia	7.ª	09/2022
SLM to SLV	Piauí	9.ª	11/2022
SLW to SML	Mato Grosso do Sul	7.ª	09/2023
SMM to SNJ	Maranhão	9.ª	07/2023
SNK to SPB	Pernambuco	11.ª	05/2023
SPC to SQP	Mato Grosso	9ª	07/2023
SQQ to SQU	Acre	8.ª	09/2023
SQV to SSE	Rio de Janeiro	4.ª	07/2023
SSF to SSQ	Distrito Federal	6.ª	09/2023
SSR to SWZ	São Paulo	4.ª	10/2023
SXA to SXZ	Santa Catarina	9.ª	12/2023
SYA to SYZ	Minas Gerais	14.ª	11/2023
SZA to SZZ	Pará	9.ª	12/2023
TAA to TAH	Amazonas	7.ª	03/2024
TAI to TBZ	Paraná	4.ª	07/2024
TCA to TEZ	Minas Gerais	16.ª	07/2024
TFA to TGN	Goiás	11.ª	12/2024
TGO to TGQ	Amapá	4.ª	09/2024
TGR to THH	Bahia	12.ª	02/2025
THI to THM	Rondônia	8.ª	09/2024
THN to TIN	Ceará	12.ª	10/2024
TIO to TMJ	São Paulo	5.ª	09/2024
TMK to TNG	Bahia	13.ª	09/2025
TNH to TNT	Alagoas	12.ª	09/2024
TNU to TOD	Sergipe	8.ª	01/2025
TOE to TOS	Espírito Santo	11.ª	02/2025
TOT to TPH	Paraíba	10.ª	11/2024
TPI to TQE	Santa Catarina	10.ª	02/2025
TQF a TQN	Sequence not allocated yet	—N/a	—N/a
TQO to TRW	Rio Grande do Sul	2.ª	05/2025
TRX to TSO	Amazonas	8.ª	12/2024
TSP to TSZ	Rio Grande do Norte	9.ª	12/2024
TTA to TUX	Rio de Janeiro	5.ª	11/2024
TUY to TUZ	Distrito Federal	7.ª	12/2024
TVA to TVD	Tocantins	9.ª	05/2025
TVE to TVJ	Sequence not allocated yet	—N/a	—N/a
TVK	Distrito Federal	8.ª	07/2025
TVL to TWK	Pará	10.ª	06/2025
TWL to TWX	Sequence not allocated yet	—N/a	—N/a
TWY to UAH	Minas Gerais	17.ª	07/2025
UAI	Minas Gerais	15.ª	06/2024
UAJ to UAR	Rondônia	9.ª	07/2025
UAS to UCZ	Paraná	5.ª	09/2025
UDA to UGV	São Paulo	6.ª	08/2025
UGW to UHI	Sequence not allocated yet	—N/a	—N/a
UHJ to UII	Pernambuco	12.ª	10/2025
UIJ to UIU	Sequence not allocated yet	—N/a	—N/a
UIV to UJL	Distrito Federal	9.ª	10/2025
UJM to UKE	Maranhão	10.ª	01/2026
UKF to UKN	Piauí	10.ª	10/2025
UKO to UKQ	Amapá	5.ª	01/2026
UKR to ZZZ	Sequence not allocated yet	—N/a	—N/a

Note: The SAV sequence was first used by São Paulo in September 2009, but was discontinued using only SAV 0A01 to 1A00, later the remainder of the sequence was assigned to Ceará in December 2021, being SAV 1A01 to 9J99.

=== Distribution by number of combinations ===
Available combinations for State (up to january, 2026):

State	FU	Number of transfers (By thousands)	Total combinations
Sequências not allocated yet	—N/a	3.839	38.386.161
São Paulo	São Paulo	3.846	38.447.155
Minas Gerais	Minas Gerais	1.643	16.428.357
Rio de Janeiro	Rio de Janeiro	1.056	10.558.944
Paraná	Paraná	988	9.879.012
Rio Grande do Sul	Rio Grande do Sul	788	7.879.212
Santa Catarina	Santa Catarina	629	6.289.371
Bahia	Bahia	568	5.679.432
Goiás	Goiás	485	4.849.515
Pernambuco	Pernambuco	450	4.499.550
Ceará	Ceará	402	4.018.598
Pará	Pará	317	3.169.683
Distrito Federal	Distrito Federal	316	3.159.684
Mato Grosso	Mato Grosso	280	2.799.720
Espírito Santo	Espírito Santo	270	2.699.730
Maranhão	Maranhão	262	2.619.738
Mato Grosso do Sul	Mato Grosso do Sul	192	1.919.808
Paraíba	Paraíba	184	1.839.816
Piauí	Piauí	164	1.639.836
Rio Grande do Norte	Rio Grande do Norte	162	1.619.838
Amazonas	Amazonas	160	1.599.840
Rondônia	Rondônia	135	1.349.865
Alagoas	Alagoas	133	1.329.867
Sergipe	Sergipe	111	1.109.889
Tocantins	Tocantins	92	919.908
Acre	Acre	42	419.958
Amapá	Amapá	33	329.967
Roraima	Roraima	29	289.971

== Mercosur standard (2018-current) ==
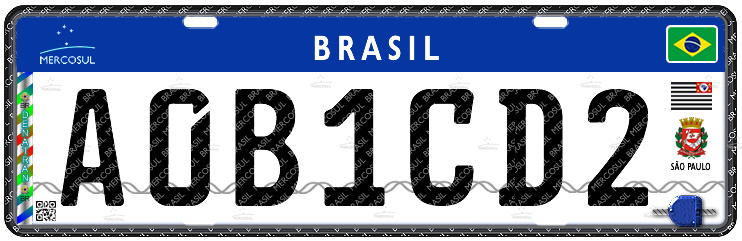
Pre-production sample of Brazil's Mercosur license plate. Note that the actual implemented alphanumeric format is different from the one shown above: it is LLLNLNN and not LNLNLLN, as seen here

In October 2014 the design of the new license plate to be used by all Mercosul countries was officially presented. This consists of a plate of 15.75 in × 5.12 in (400.05 mm × 130.05 mm), with a white background, the characters and frame in black and a blue band at the top that shows the name of the country, its flag and the Mercosul logo. The typeface used is FE-Schrift.

In September, 2018, Mercosul standard license plates started to be adopted in Rio de Janeiro. As of January 2020, all states have started issuing the new plates. By the end of 2023, all vehicles are expected to be carrying these new plates.

The Mercosul license plates have a new alphanumeric format that will allow for more available combinations. While the previous system used a LLL-#### format, the new format is LLL#L##. Vehicles who are to switch their old license plates for the new one will retain their previous license plate number, with the exception of the 2nd digit (5th character). The number in that position of the alphanumberic format is being replaced by a letter, in accordance with the below table.

Corresponding 5th Characters in the previous and current Brazilian Plates
2nd Digit in the previous plate Design (ABC·1234 Format)	4th Letter in the Mercosul Format (ABC1C23 Format)
0	A
1	B
2	C
3	D
4	E
5	F
6	G
7	H
8	I
9	J
