= Vehicle registration plates of Jordan =

Hashemite Kingdom of Jordan
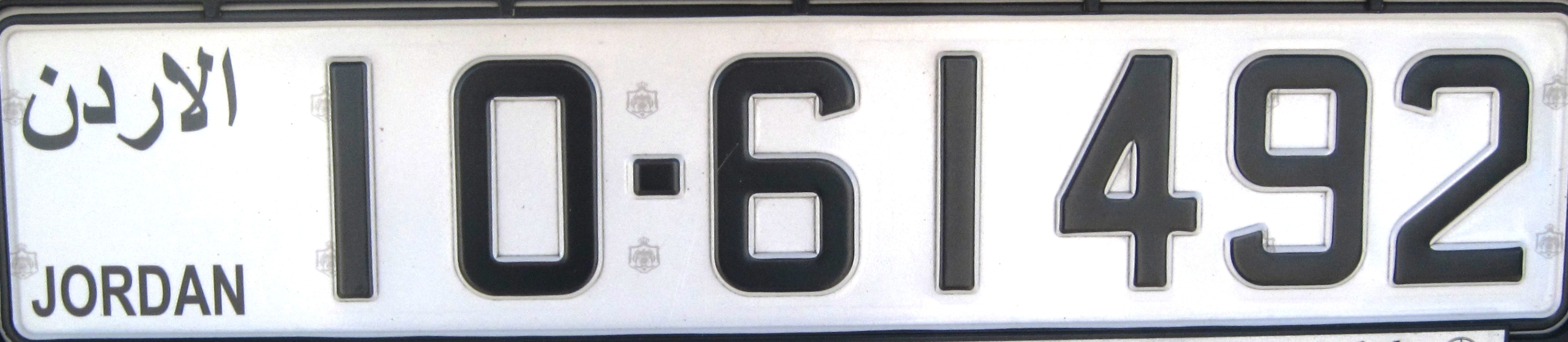
- Jordanian regular legal standard number plate.
- Country: Jordan
- Country code: HKJ

Current series
- Size: 520 mm × 110 mm 20.5 in × 4.3 in
- Serial format: Not standard
- Colour (front): Black on white
- Colour (rear): Black on white

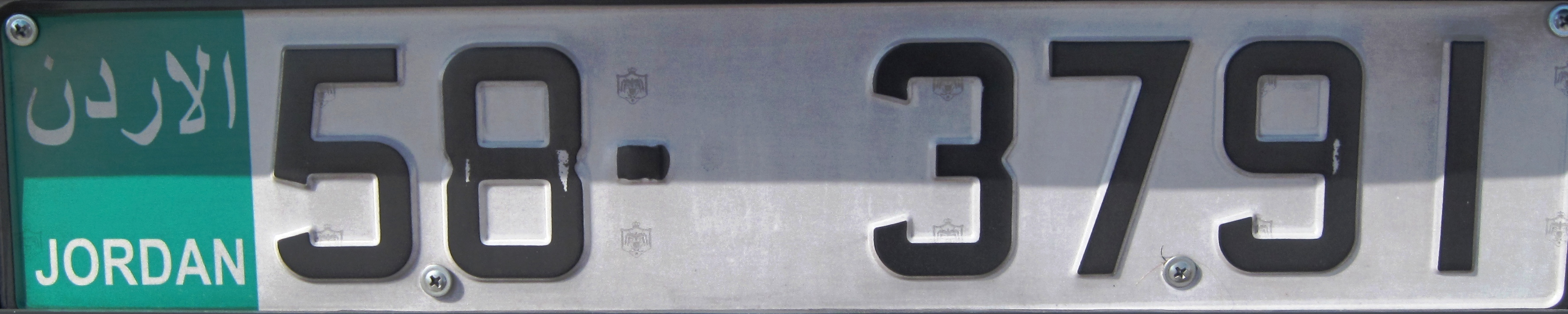
Public transport registration plate

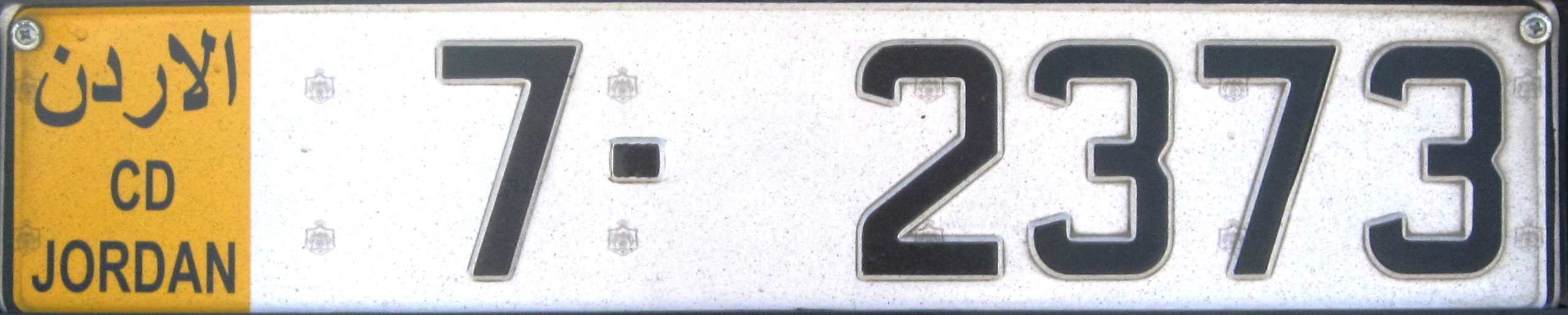
Diplomatic registration plate

Jordan requires its residents to register their motor vehicles and display vehicle registration plates. The country's international vehicle registration code is HKJ.

The current system was introduced in 2007, with the plates largely based on European specifications. The font used strongly resembles that found on present British registration plates.

For passenger cars, private plates are also available. As of August 2013, the normal series had reached 21-30000; however, private plates going up to a 49 prefix have been seen. Generally, the lower the suffix number, the more expensive they are, with plates from the 10 series having the most prestige. Suffix numbers on private vehicle registration plates can be as short as a single digit; therefore, the first number issued was technically 10-1. (As of August 2025 we have 1-1)

As of August 2025, prefixes 1–9 have been released for public use and are now available for private ownership. The numeric prefixes 1–9, previously reserved, have been replaced by letter prefixes for government and parliamentary vehicles. The format is: ll-nnnnn (usually 4 or 5 digits).

Newly published code 1 prefix license plate.

| Type | Colour of Strip | Extra Text on Strip | Code | Image 550x110mm | Image 335x155mm (Outdated) |
|---|---|---|---|---|---|
| Executive Branch | Red, White Text | مجلس الوزراء | PM | | |
| Legislative Branch | Red, White Text | مجلس النواب | PR/SN | | |
| Judicial Branch | Red, White Text | مجلس قضائي | JC | | |
| Governmental | Red, White Text | حكومي | GV | | |
| Aqaba Free Trade Zone | Red, White Text | سلطة العقبة | AQ | | |
| Diplomatic | Yellow, Black Text | دبلوماسي | CD | | |
| Temporary | Blue, Black Text | موقت | TM | | |
| Private | White, Black Text | | 1-49 66/77 80/81/88 | | |
| Van | White, Black Text | | 36-37 | | |
| Pick-up Truck | White, Black Text | | 38-40 | | |
| Light Goods Vehicle | White, Black Text | | 41-43 | | |
| Agricultural | White, Black Text | | 44 | | |
| Construction Truck | White, Black Text | | 45 | | |
| Motorcycle | White, Black Text | | 46-47 | | |
| Taxi | Green, White Text | | 50-55 | | |
| City Bus | Green, White Text | | 56-57 | | |
| Coach Bus | Green, White Text | | 58-59 | | |
| Heavy Goods Vehicle | Green, White Text | | 60 | | |
| Rental | Green, Yellow Text | | 70 | | |
| Trailer | Yellow, Black Text | TRL | 71 | | |
| Customs exemption | White, Black Text | | 81 | | |
| Army | "ARMY" (Instead of Jordan) | | 90 | | |
| Ambulance | الدفاع المدنی (Instead of Jordan) | | 95 | | |
| Gendarmerie | قوات الدرك (Instead of Jordan) | | 96 | | |
| Police | الامن العام (Instead of Jordan) | | 99 | | |
