= Vehicle registration plates of Liechtenstein =

Principality of Liechtenstein Fürstentum Liechtenstein
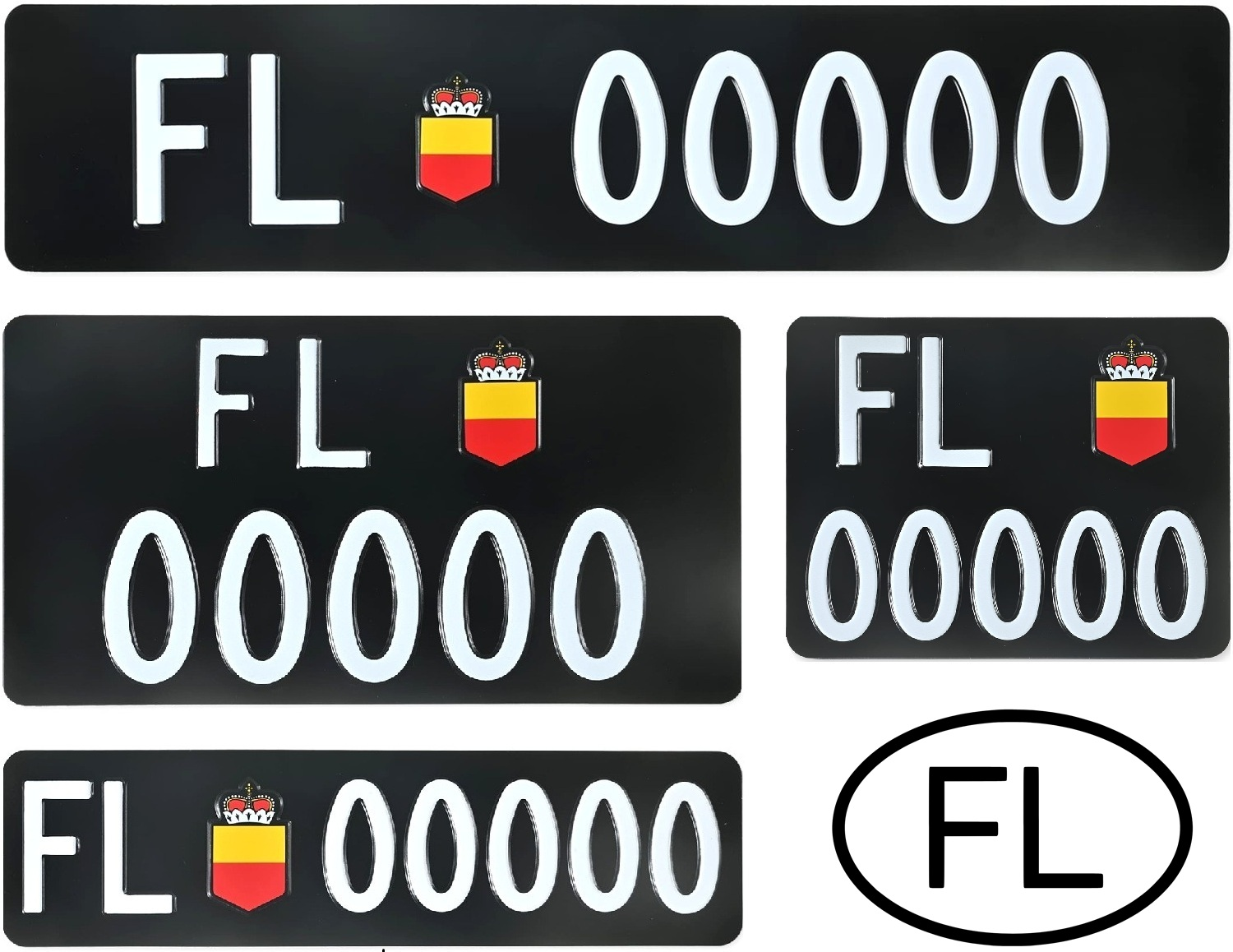
- Liechtenstein regular legal standard rear (top and center) and front (bottom) number plates
- Country: Liechtenstein
- Country code: FL

Current series
- Material: Aluminium
- Serial format: FL 12345
- Front plate: 300 mm × 80 mm (11 3/4 in × 3 1/4 in)
- Rear plate: 500 mm × 110 mm (19 3/4 in × 4 1/4 in); 300 mm × 160 mm (11 3/4 in × 6 1/4 in)
- Colour (front): White on Black
- Colour (rear): White on Black
- Introduced: 1924

Availability
- Issued by: National Road Office
- Manufactured by: Plaque Suisse Ltd.

History
- First issued: 1915

Vehicle registration plates are the alphanumeric plates used to display the registration mark of a vehicle, and have existed in the Principality of Liechtenstein since 1906. Vehicle registration plates of the Principality of Liechtenstein are rectangular or square in shape, with the exact permitted dimensions of the plate and its lettering set down in law. The registration marks are composed of the letters FL, standing for Fürstentum Liechtenstein, followed by the small version of the coat of arms of Liechtenstein and up to five digits. Due to the small size of the country (160 km², 42,000 inhabitants), no further distinguishing marks are necessary. Standard license plates are labeled with white characters on a black base. This system, which has followed the same pattern for over 100 years, is the oldest still in use in Europe.

The white-on-black color combination was introduced in 1915 and the current serial format was launched in 1924. The current design of the registration plates has been used since 1972. The numbering process and the color system essentially correspond to that of Swiss vehicle registration plates. The numbers are assigned consecutively in ascending order to the vehicle owners, not to the vehicles. It is possible to use two vehicles under one license plate. However, only one vehicle may be in operation at any given time. Rear license plates can be requested either in a long rectangular format of 500 × 110 mm or in a square format of 300 × 160 mm. The dimensions of the plates, as well as the typeface of the characters are similar to those of Swiss registration plates. License plates of both countries are produced by the same manufacturer.

Since 2001, Liechtenstein has been the only sovereign European state to issue black vehicle registration plates for all motor vehicles. In other European countries, black license plates are only issued for specific vehicle groups, e. g. historical or military vehicles or as an option alongside yellow or white license plates, as is the case, for example, on the Bailiwick of Guernsey.

As of June 30, 2025, a total of 47,204 vehicles were registered for road use in Liechtenstein, including 31,683 passenger cars, 5,044 motorcycles, 4,163 trailers and caravans, 3,275 vans, 291 trucks, 211 semi-trailer trucks, 985 agricultural vehicles, 879 utility vehicles, 551 motorhomes, 58 city buses and 31 coaches.

== History ==
Due to its geographical location and the origins of the Princely House, Liechtenstein maintained strong political and economic ties with the Austro-Hungarian Monarchy for many years. The customs and tax treaty of 1852 created a customs union between the two states, which continued throughout the development of motorized road transport until August 2, 1919.

- 1905 - On September 27, 1905, Austria introduced mandatory registration of motor vehicles, which was adopted identically by the government of Liechtenstein. The corresponding regulation came into effect on July 1, 1906. For the time being, a separate regulation was refrained from being implemented, which was understandable given the small number of domestic cars on the roads. The Austrian identification markings, which from now on had to be affixed to motor vehicles in Liechtenstein, were issued by the district commission in Feldkirch and had black letters on a white background. The license plates were labeled with the letter W, the assigned letter for the Austrian federal state of Vorarlberg, Liechtenstein's immediate neighbor, and an evidence number of up to three digits, e. g. W 123.
- 1915 - On August 12, 1915, the government of Liechtenstein issued a decree mandating the introduction of independent license plates. The license plates were inscribed with white characters on a black background and the registration mark consisted of the letter L for Liechtenstein and an individual number. The existing Austrian vehicle registration plates remained valid until 1922. The very first vehicle registration plate of Liechtenstein, L 1, was issued to the owner of a motorcycle in February 1919. Later, the registration marks L 2 through L 17 followed.

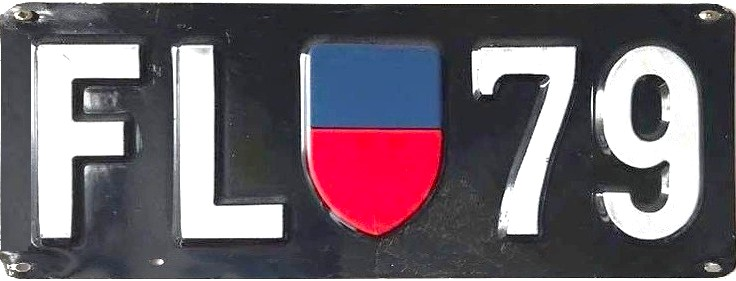
Early Liechtenstein motorcycle license plate (circa 1930) in the then-standard format, featuring the Liechtenstein coat of arms in blue and red. These plates were issued from 1924 to 1961.

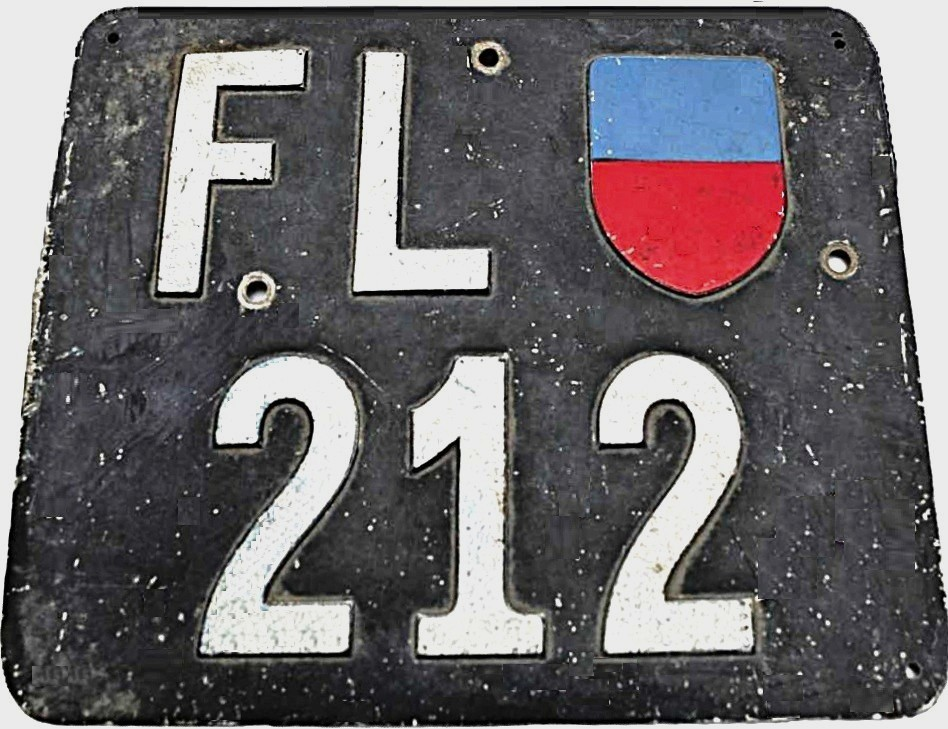
Two-line Liechtenstein license plate in the then-standard square format of 310 × 240 mm, featuring the Liechtenstein coat of arms in blue and red. These plates were issued from 1924 to 1961.

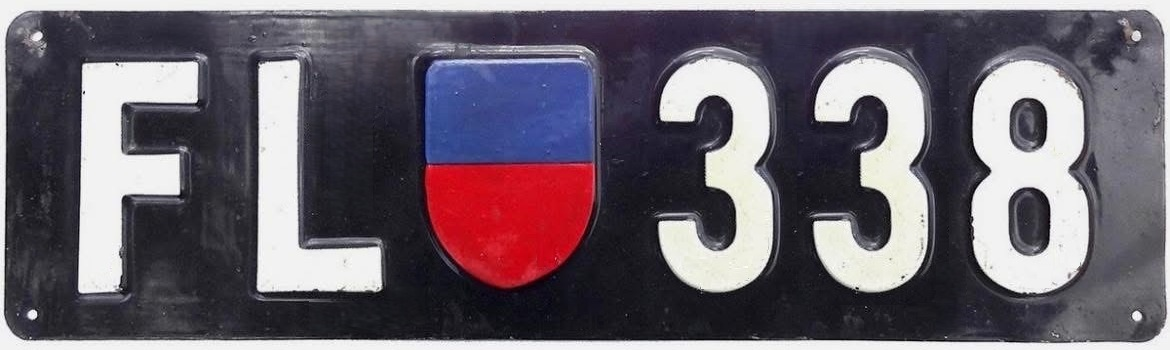
Liechtenstein license plate featuring the Liechtenstein coat of arms in blue and red. These plates were issued between 1924 and 1961.

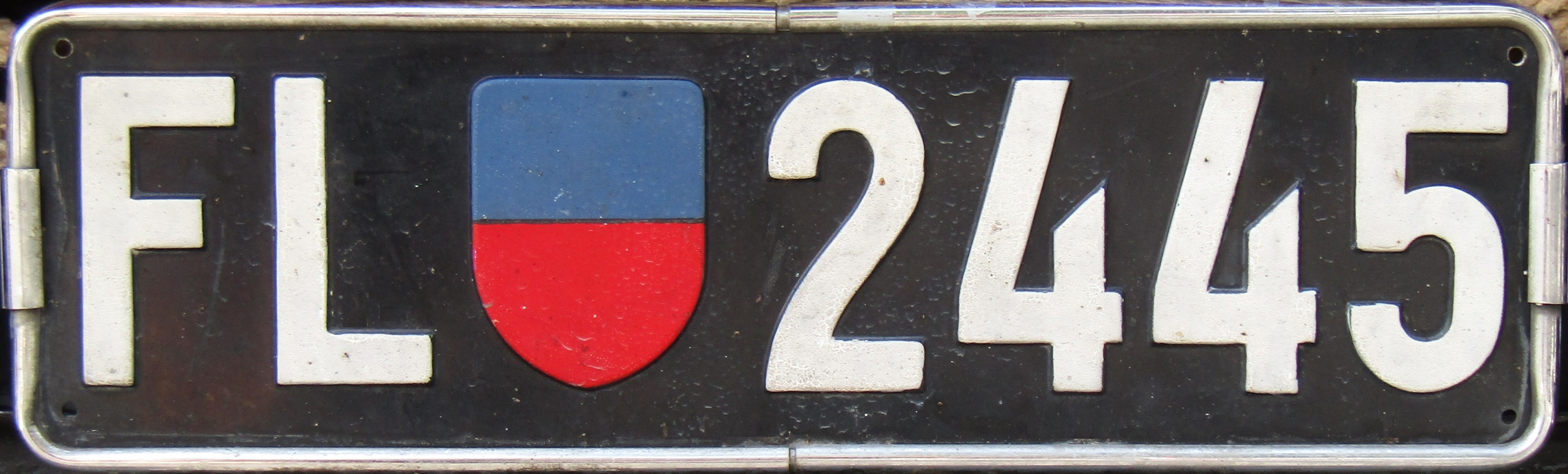
Liechtenstein license plate in the then-standard long format of 380 × 110 mm, featuring the Liechtenstein coat of arms in blue and red. According to the owner, this license plate "FL 2445" was issued in 1952.

- 1924 - On May 1, 1924, Liechtenstein acceded to the International Convention with respect to the Circulation of Motor Vehicles, signed at Paris, October 11, 1909. With this accession, the Principality of Liechtenstein had to choose a country code. Since the letter "L" was already assigned to Luxembourg, the code "FL" was chosen. On December 4, 1924, the government of Liechtenstein issued an implementing regulation which stipulated that every motor vehicle must display two license plates bearing the letters FL and a registration number. Motorcycles needed one license plate (labeled on both sides) on the front wheel.
- 1925 - On January 1, 1925, the new regulation came into effect. Newly designed license plates were issued, which now also included a coat of arms. The coat of arms featured the Liechtenstein national colors of blue and red. These registration plates established the basic design that is still used today, making them one of the oldest continuous license plate systems. The blue and red coat of arms remained on the plates until 1961, when the government and state parliament dealt with the new coat of arms law of 1957.

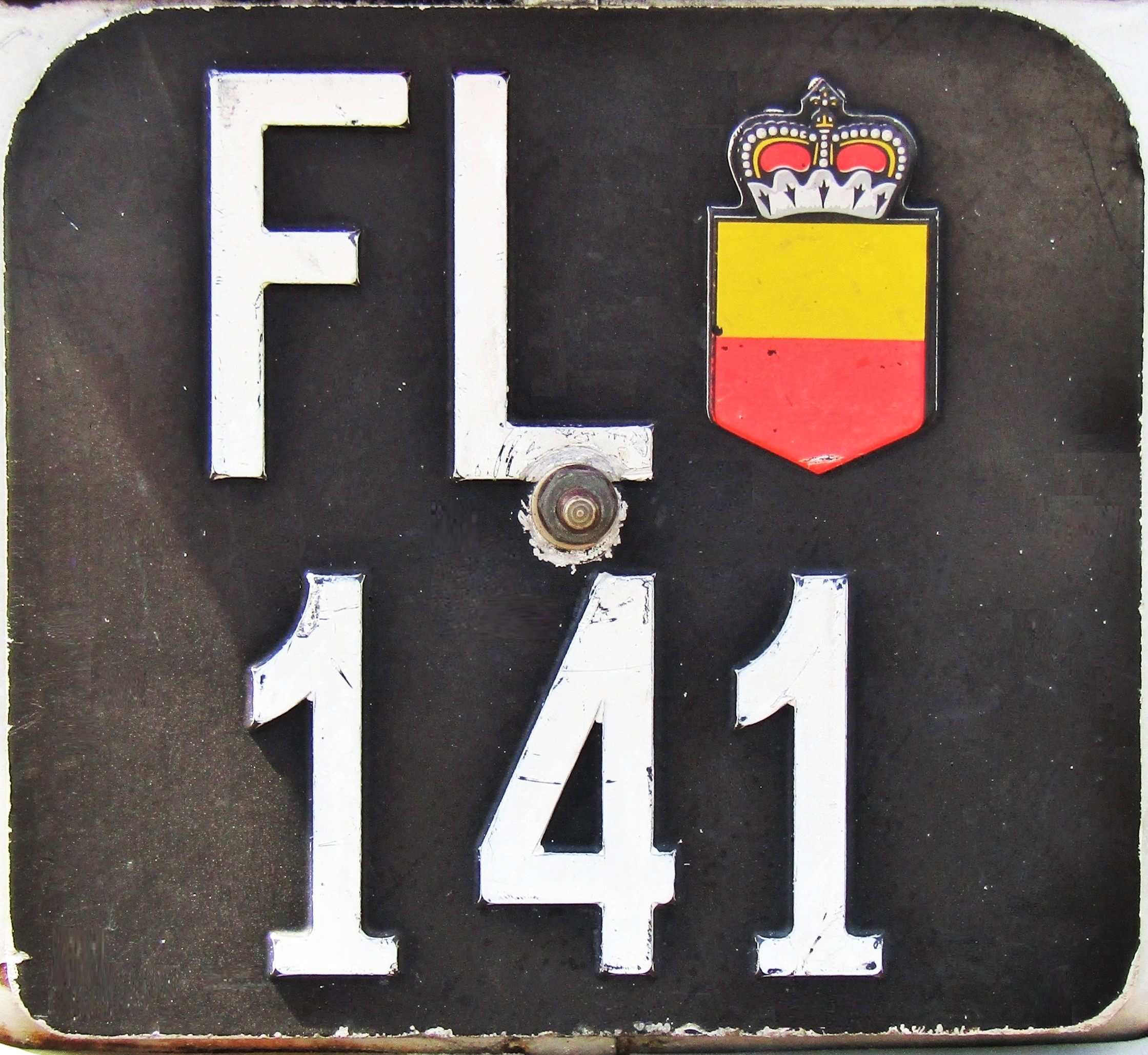
Liechtenstein motorcycle license plate with the gold and red heart-shaped shield of the Prince's coat of arms as a sticker, instead of the painted national coat of arms. This motorcycle license plate was issued between 1961 and 1972 and is still mounted on a Vespa today.

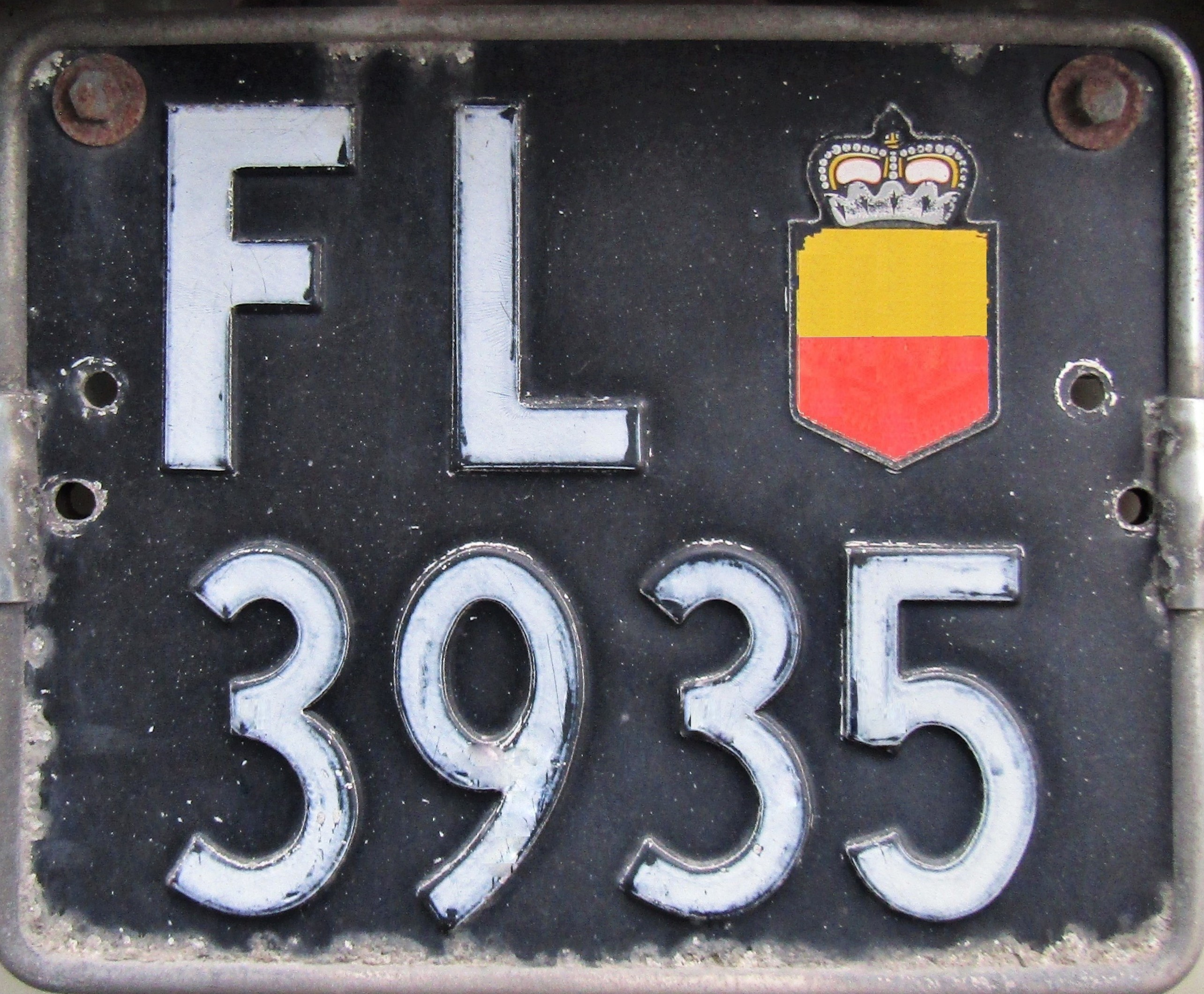
Two-line Liechtenstein license plate in the then-standard square format of 310 × 240 mm, with the gold and red escutcheon of the Prince's coat of arms as a sticker, instead of the painted national coat of arms. These plates were issued between 1961 and 1972.

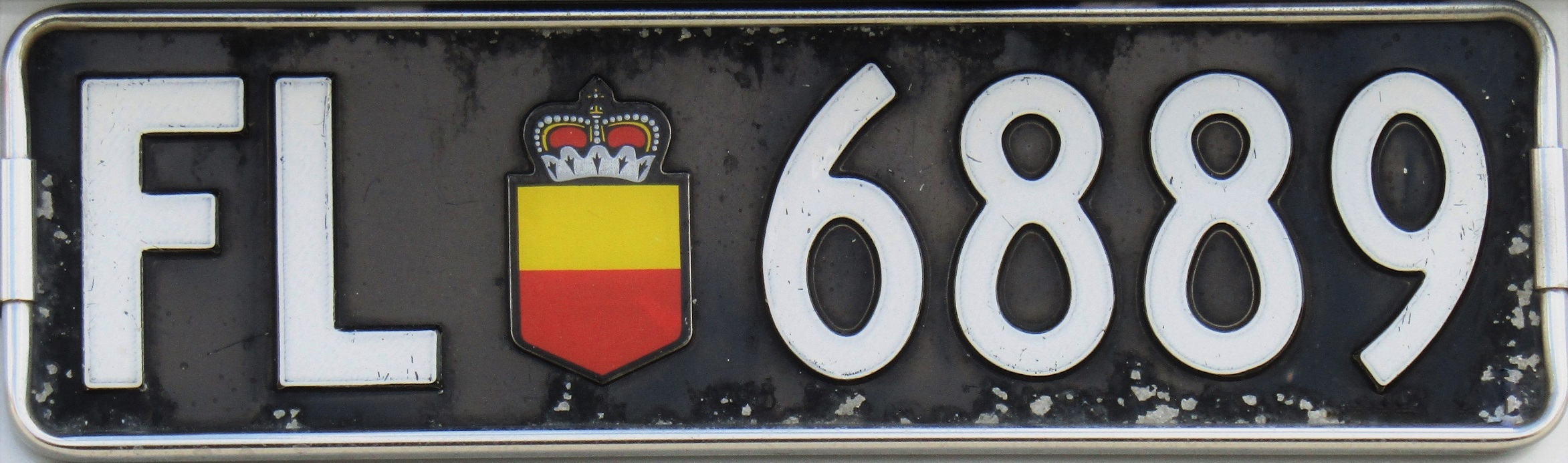
Liechtenstein license plate in the then-standard long format of 380 × 110 mm, with the gold and red escutcheon of the Princely Coat of Arms as a sticker. These plates were issued between 1961 and 1972.

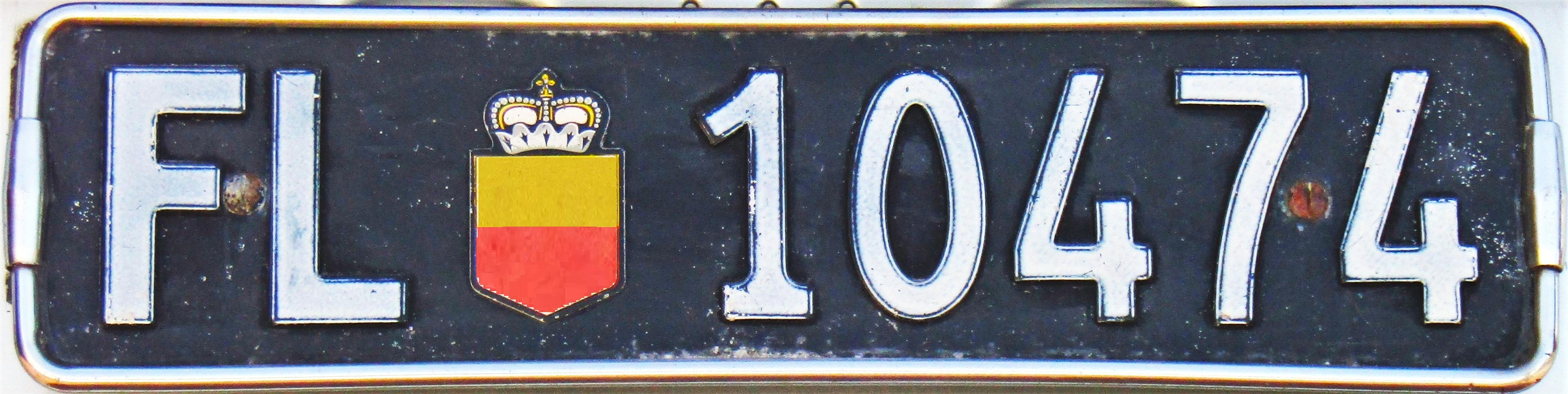
Liechtenstein license plate in the then-standard long format of 440 × 110 mm, with five digits and the gold and red escutcheon of the Princely Coat of Arms as a sticker. These plates were issued between 1961 and 1972.

- 1957 - In 1957, during the revision of the Coat of Arms Act, the state parliament decided that, in addition to the "large coat of arms", the "small coat of arms" could also be used for official state symbols. According to the Coat of Arms Act, the small coat of arms is the "gold and red divided escutcheon," which rendered the previously used "coat of arms in blue and red" illegal and required it to be replaced by the gold and red coat of arms.
- 1961 - On June 23, 1961, the state parliament approved a loan of 20,000 Swiss francs for the purpose of producing new license plates or exchanging the old ones. Newly designed license plates were introduced, distinguished by the use of the escutcheon of the princely coat of arms as a sticker, instead of the painted national coat of arms.
- 1972 - In 1972, the dimensions of the plates were adapted to the Swiss license plates and the coat of arms was reduced to its current size. Existing license plates remained valid if they were still in good condition. Vehicles with well-preserved license plates of the period from 1961 to 1972 can still be seen on the road in Liechtenstein today.

== Current System ==
Motor vehicles in Liechtenstein must be equipped with front and rear license plates made of corrosion-resistant metal. Current license plates are made of aluminium and may have a reflective or photoluminescent coating. License plates are generally issued based on availability. Returned license plates are put back into circulation after a reasonable period, but no sooner than one year. If no such plates are available, new license plates with consecutive numbers are produced. Unlike in most other European countries, Liechtenstein license plates are not assigned to a specific vehicle, but to its registered owner. If the owner changes vehicles, the license plates can be mounted on the new vehicle after registration. If the owner does not register a new vehicle, the license plates must be returned to the issuing authority, the National Road Office in Vaduz.

=== Colors ===
The background color of license plates depends on their intended use and the vehicle type. The plates are numbered independently, so it's possible for several vehicles to have the same license plate number. The color system is essentially the same as that of Swiss license plates. The following color combinations exist:

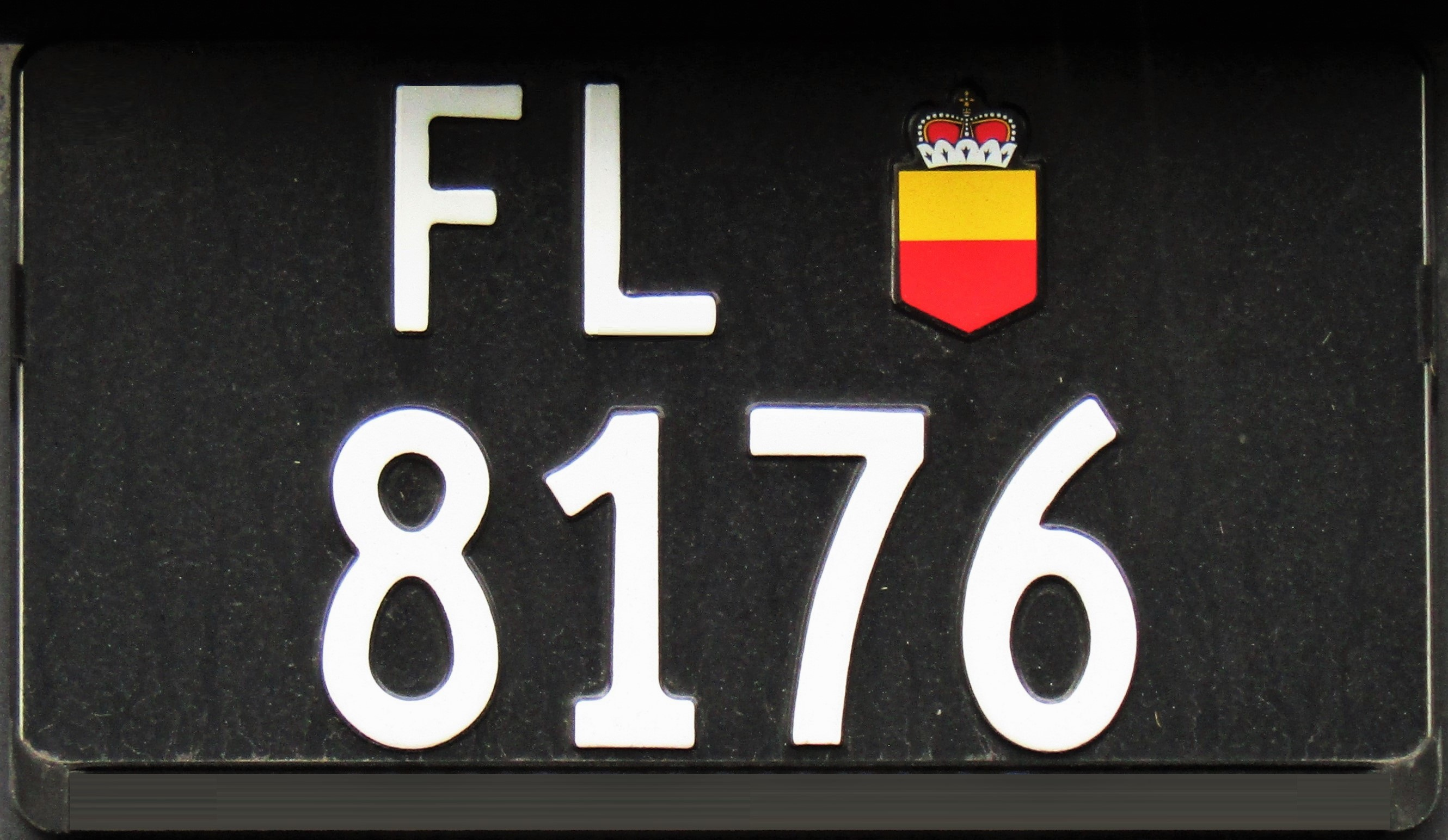
Liechtenstein license plate, rear plate in a square format of 300 × 160 mm, for passenger cars, trucks, buses, trailers, commercial tractors.

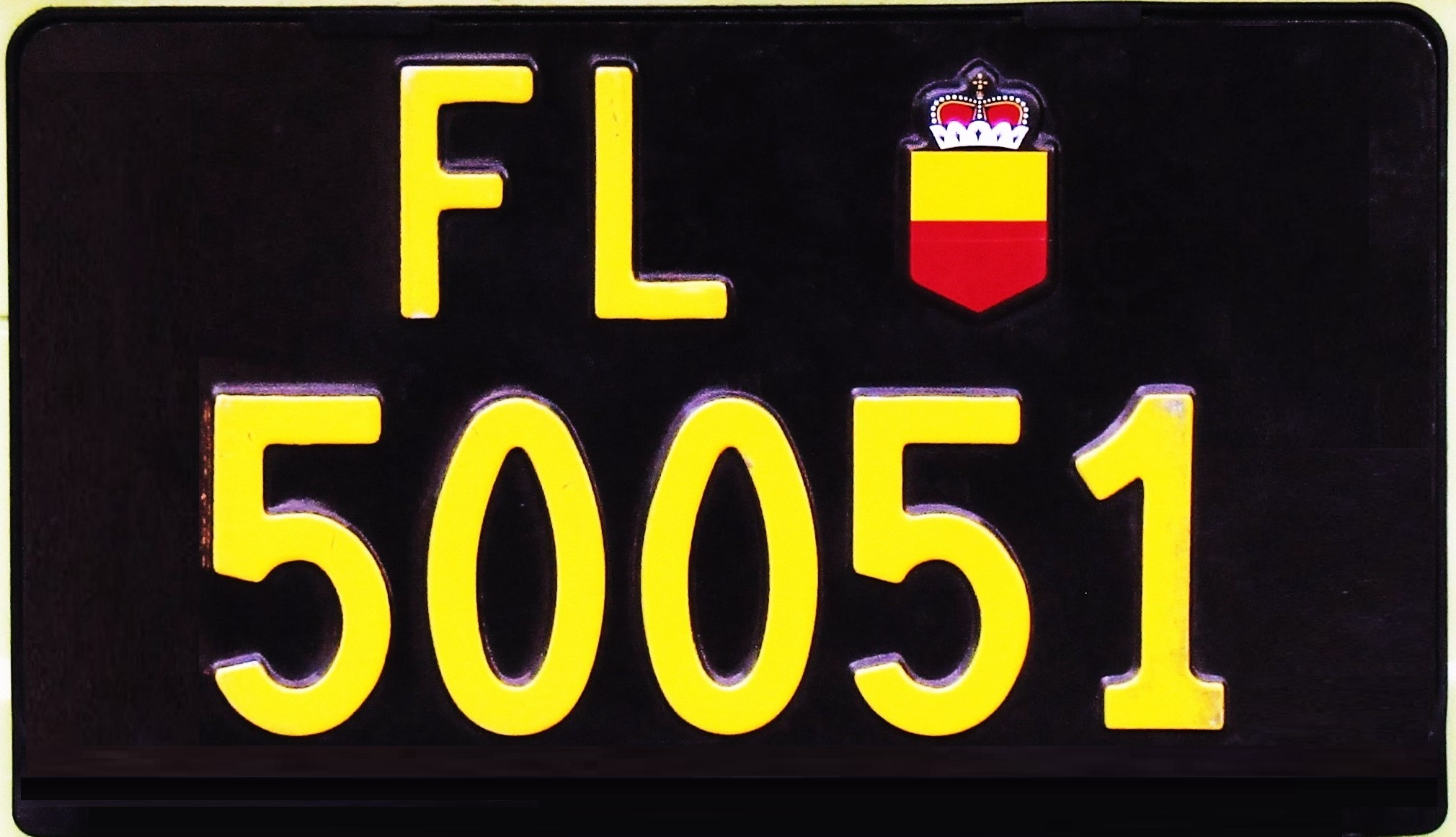
License plates with black background and yellow lettering are short-term license plates for motor vehicles and trailers, valid for up to 4 days, rear plate in a square format of 300 × 160 mm. Short-term license plates bear numbers between 50000 and 50299.

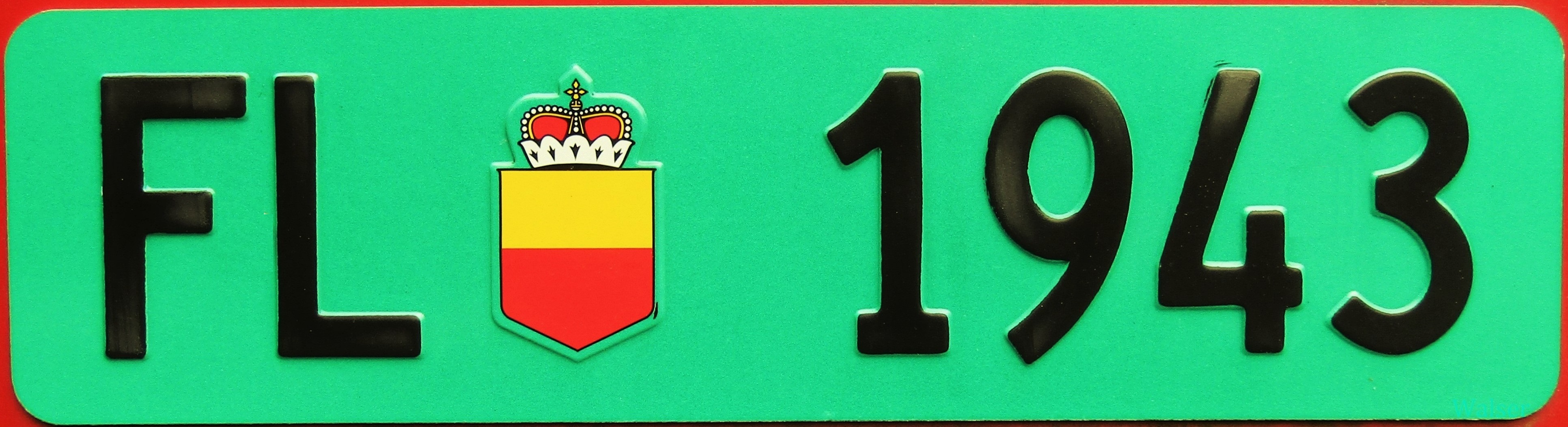
Green license plates are for agricultural and forestry vehicles and trailers. Each vehicle receives only one front plate (300 × 80 mm), which can be mounted at the front or rear of the vehicle. These plates are numbered from 21 to 2000.

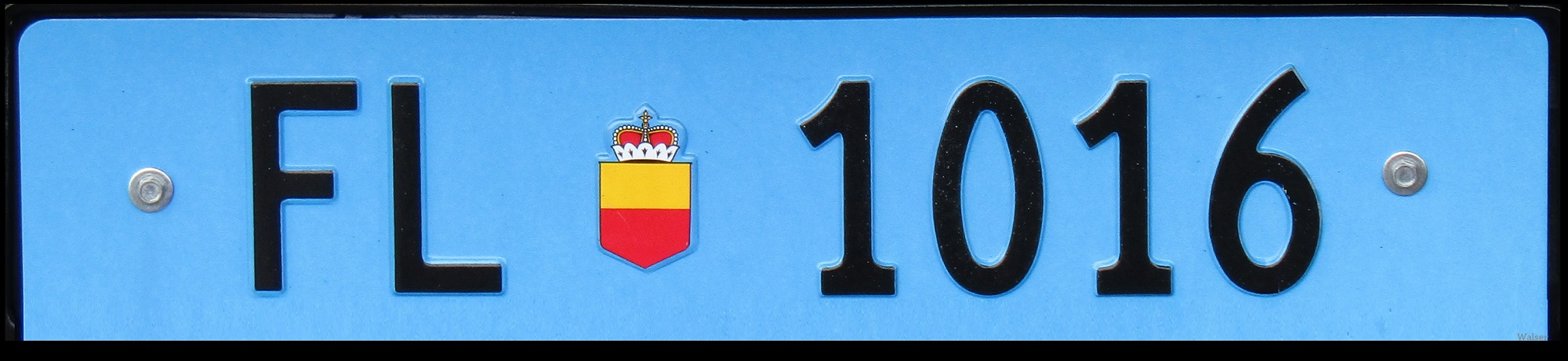
Liechtenstein rear license plate in a long format of 500 × 110 mm. License plates with a light blue background are used for utility vehicles and trailers, with numbers from 21 to 2000.

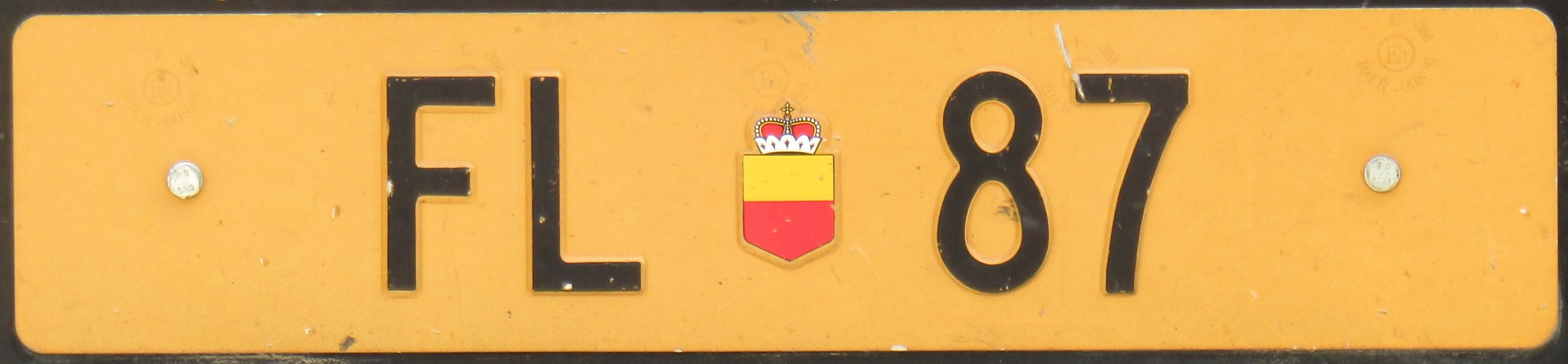
Light brown Liechtenstein license plate, rear plate, 500 × 110 mm. License plates with a light brown background are used for exceptional vehicles and trailers and are numbered from 21 to 2000. Trailer license plates are numbered above 5000.

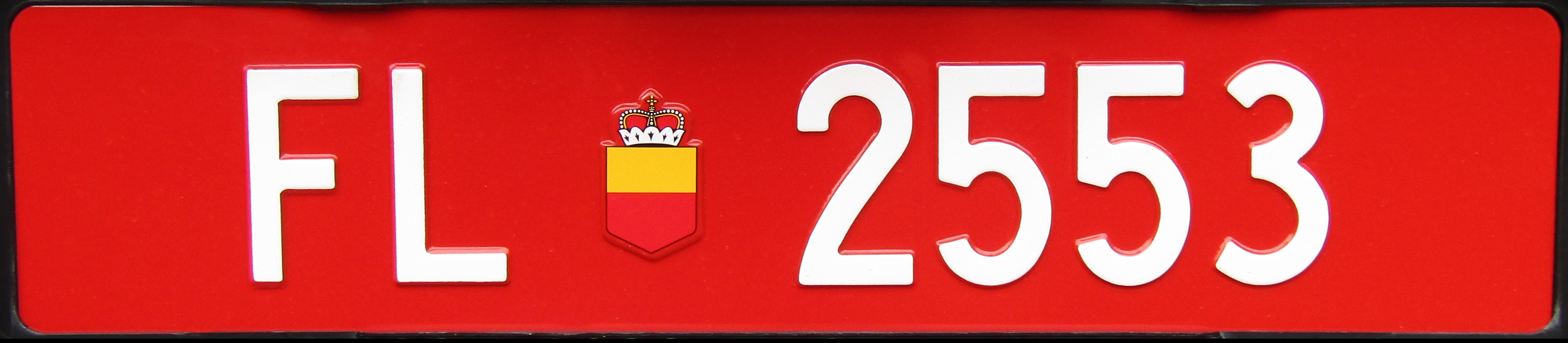
Repeater license plate, or "third number plate", for rear-mounted load carriers. These plates are issued only in a long format of 500 × 110 mm.

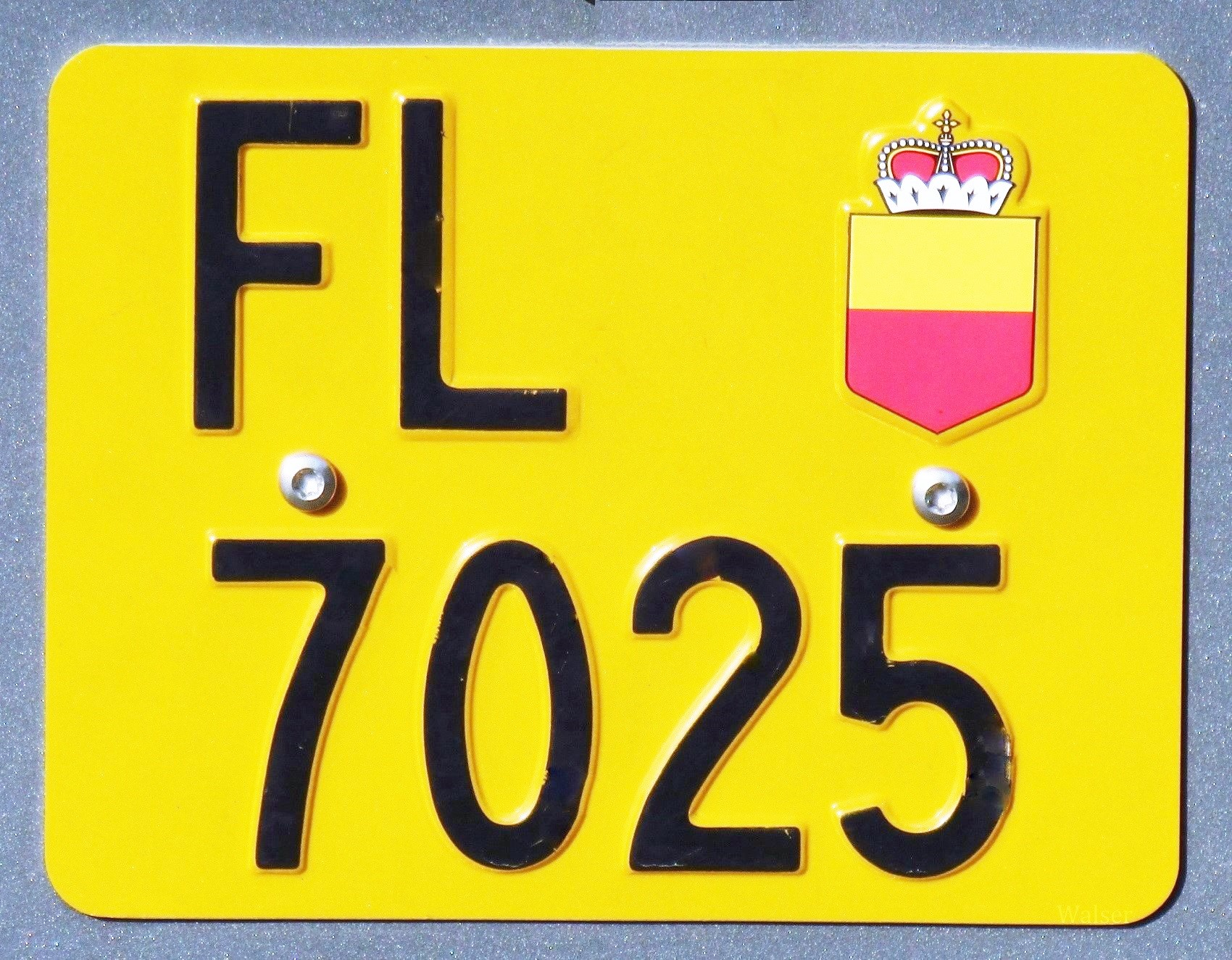
Liechtenstein motorcycle license plate with a yellow background are used for small motorcycles, light vehicles, light motor vehicles and electric vehicles. These plates are numbered between 7000 and 7999.

- License plates with a black background and white lettering are issued for passenger cars, trucks, buses, commercial tractors, trailers, motorcycles, scooters, motorized tricycles, quads, light electric vehicles, two-wheel tractors and motorcycle trailers.
- License plates with a black background and yellow lettering are short-term license plates for motor vehicles and trailers, valid for up to 4 days.
- License plates with a light green background and black lettering are issued to agricultural and forestry vehicles and trailers.
- License plates with a light blue background and black lettering are issued to utility vehicles, industrial vehicles as well as their trailers.
- License plates with a light brown background and black lettering are used for exceptional vehicles and trailers (e.g. for heavy transport).
- License plates with a red background and white lettering are repeater license plates that can be mounted as a "third license plate" on the rear load carrier.
- License plates with a yellow or dark yellow background and black lettering are issued to light vehicles, light motorcycles, small motorcycles, electric vehicles or mopeds and e-bikes.

=== Number system ===
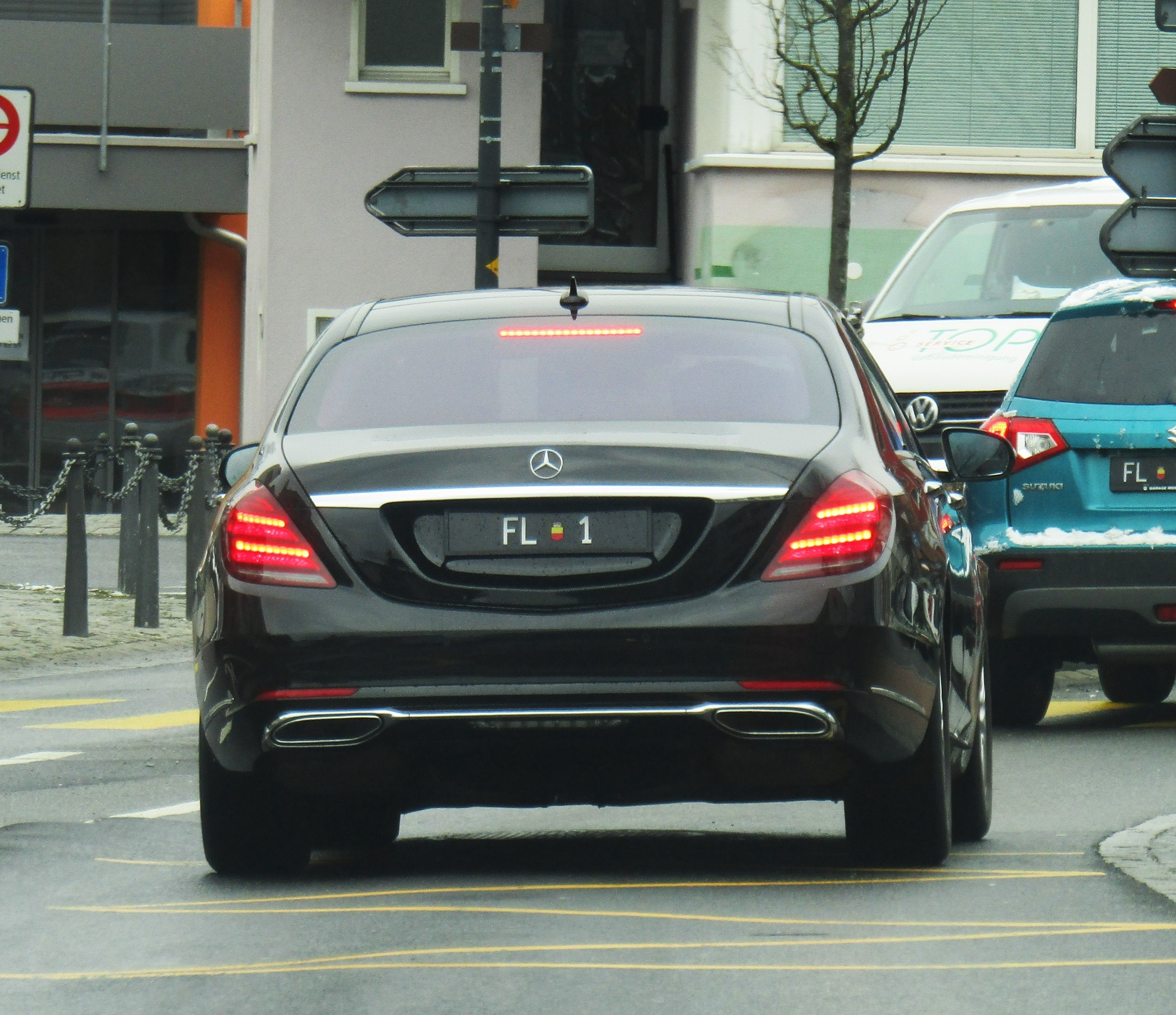
FL 1, the Prince of Liechtenstein

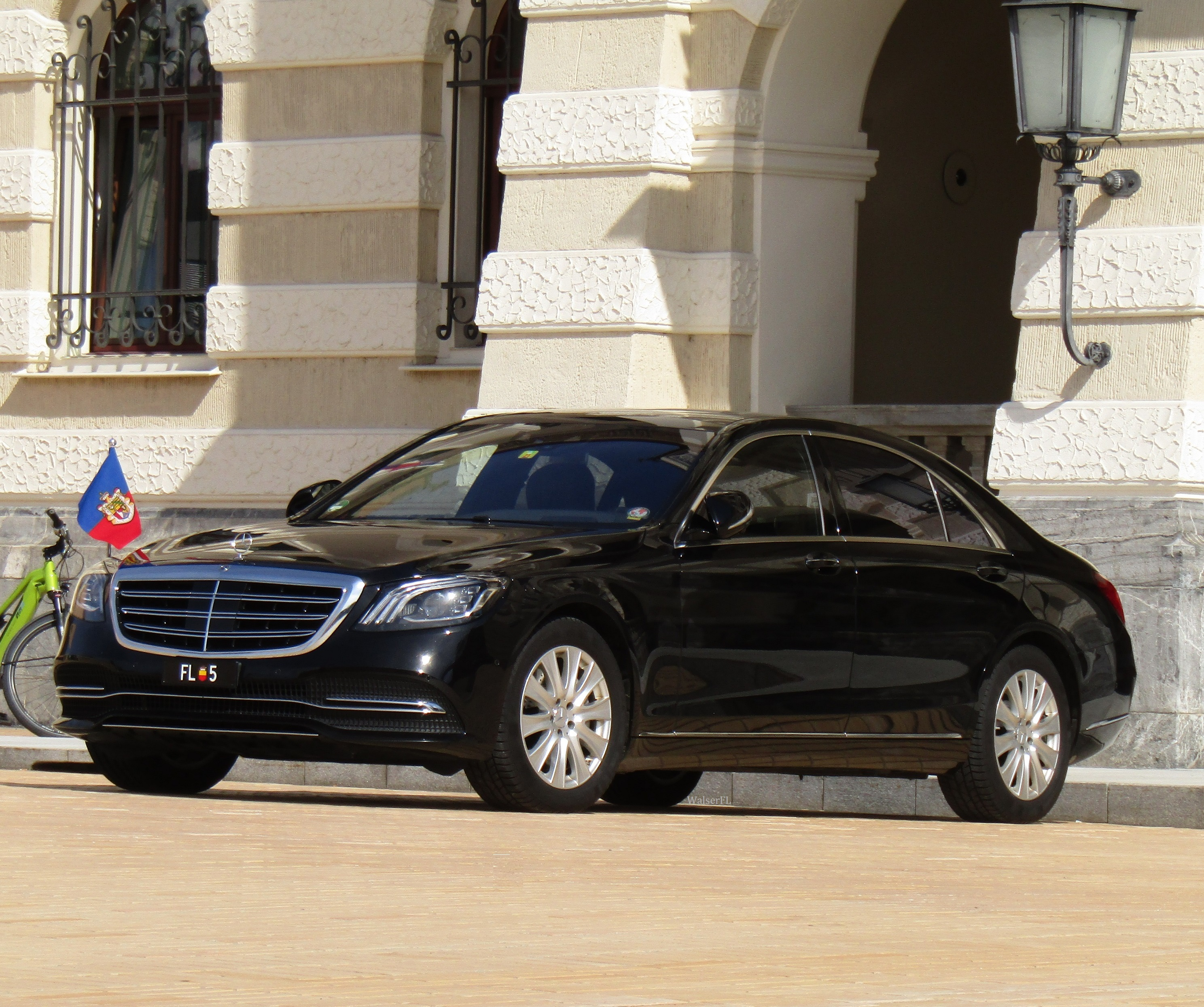
FL 5 is assigned to the Prime minister of Liechtenstein

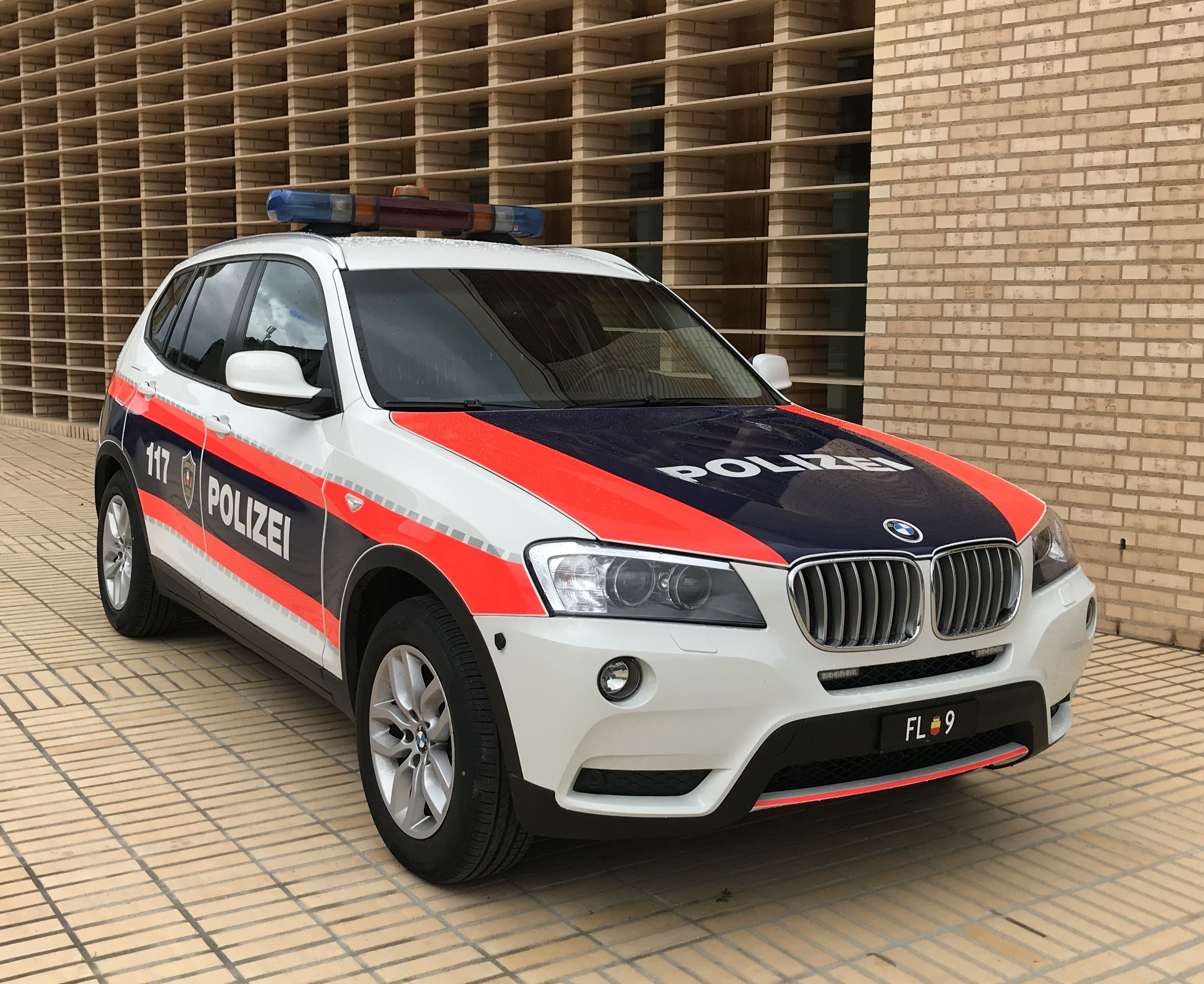
FL 9, on a marked vehicle of the Liechtenstein National Police

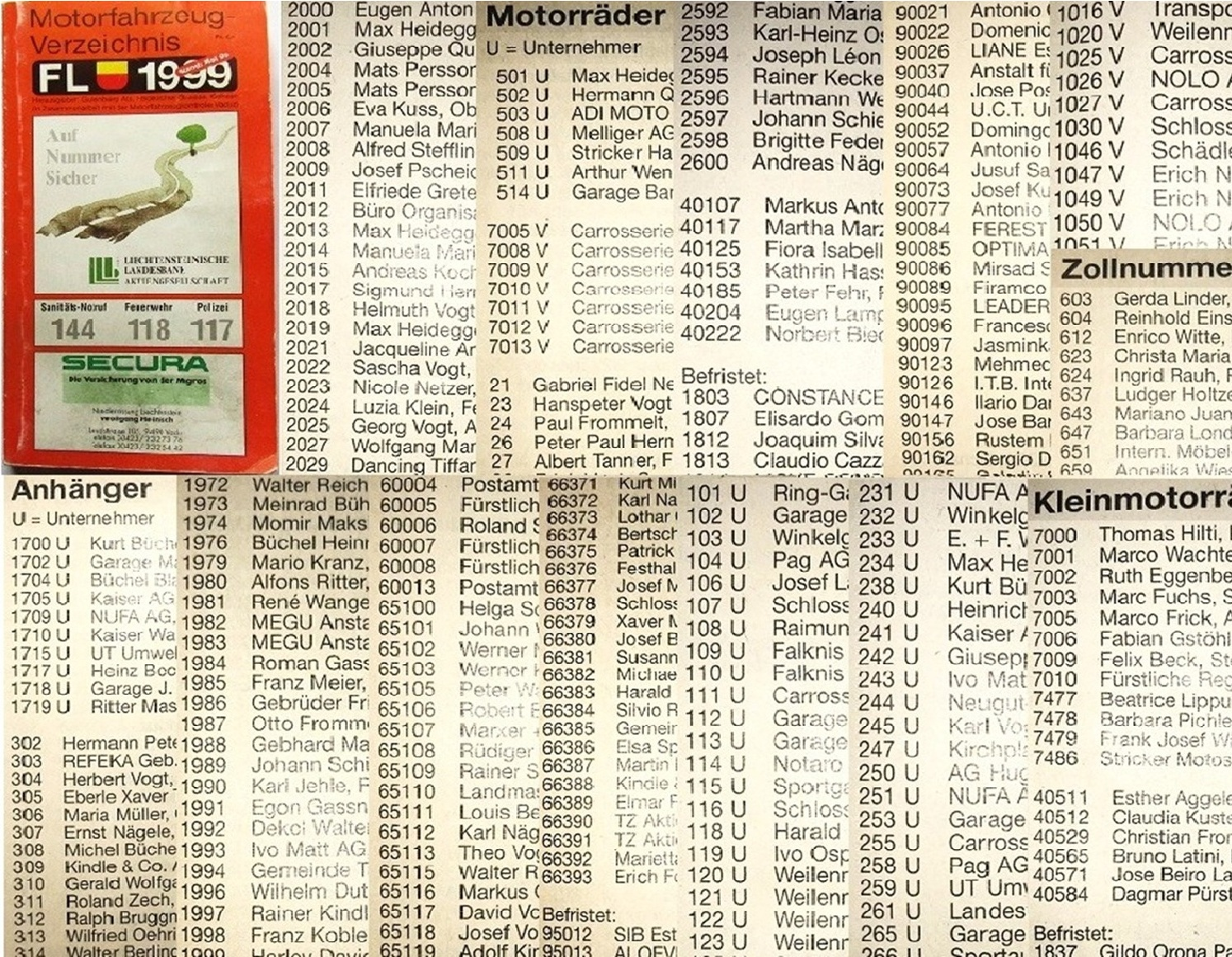
Motor vehicle directory of 1999

Numbers are assigned separately for motor vehicles and trailers on the one hand and motorcycles on the other, and for each type of license plate separately according to base color and special markings, and in ascending order. The number allocation extends to FL 99999 and is currently about 50 percent exhausted. Since the system has existed since 1924, it could suffice for many more decades, even though the number of vehicle registrations has increased significantly in the last hundred years. The numbers are divided into the following number ranges, which have been reserved for certain vehicle groups or purposes:

==== FL 1 to 20 ====
- FL 1 , FL 2 , FL 3 , FL 4 , FL 6 , FL 8 , and FL 10 were assigned to the Princely Family of Liechtenstein. These plates are only used during official occasions.
- FL 5 was assigned to the Liechtenstein government and the head of government.
- FL 7 , FL 9 and from FL 11 to FL 20 were assigned to the Liechtenstein Police.
- Numbers 1 through 20 are exclusively assigned to these official vehicles.
- For all other types of license plates, the numbering starts at 21.

==== FL 21 to 2000 ====
- FL 21 to FL 2000 are available for agricultural and forestry vehicles and trailers.
- FL 21 to FL 2000 are available for utility and industrial vehicles and trailers.
- FL 21 to FL 2000 are available for exceptional vehicles (FL 5××× for trailers).
- FL 21 to FL 6700 is the current number range for motorcycle license plates.

==== FL 101 to 50000 ====
- FL 21 to FL 100 are not available for regular cars or trailers.
- FL 101 to FL 300 are reserved numbers for dealer license plates.
- FL 301 to FL 1999 were used for the first series of trailer license plates.
- FL 2000 to FL 50000 are issued consecutively in ascending order for motor vehicles.
- In December 2025, the highest numbers were in the FL 42800 range. As of June 30, 2025, a total of 31,683 passenger cars, 3,275 vans, 291 trucks, 211 semi-trailer trucks, 551 motorhomes, 58 city buses, and 31 coaches were registered in Liechtenstein.

==== FL 50000 to 99999 ====
- FL 50001 to FL 50299 are the reserved numbers for short-term license plates.
- FL 50300 to FL 65099 A purpose has not yet been defined.
- FL 65100 to FL 70000 are assigned consecutively in ascending order for trailers.
- In December 2025, the highest numbers were in the FL 68200 range. As of June 30, 2025, a total of 4,163 trailers, semi-trailers, and caravans were registered in Liechtenstein.
- FL 70001 to FL 89999 A purpose has not yet been defined.
- FL 90000 to FL 92999 are numbers for temporary vehicle registration plates.
- FL 93000 to FL 94999 A purpose has not yet been defined.
- FL 95000 to FL 95099 are numbers for temporary trailer registration plates.
- FL 95100 to FL 99999 A purpose has not yet been defined.

=== Dimensions ===
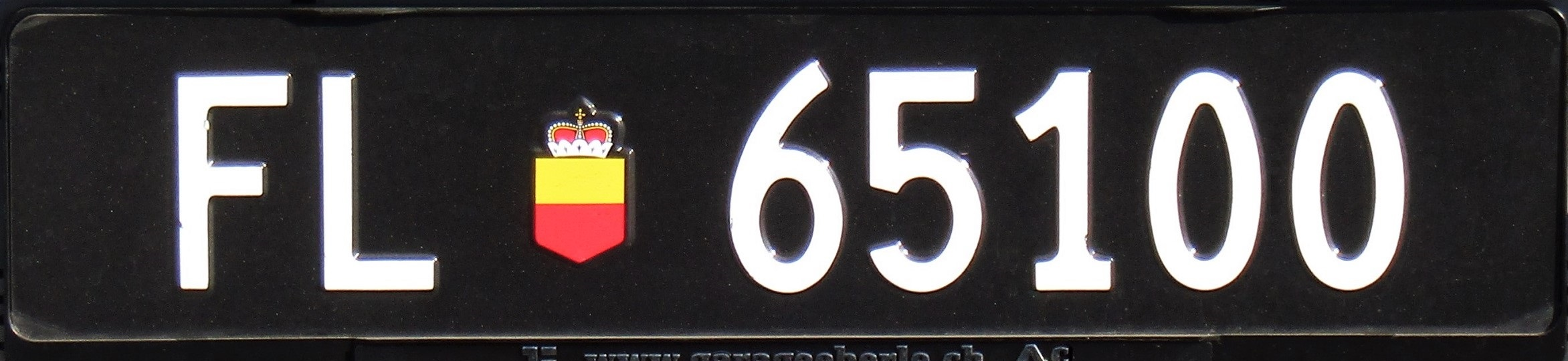
Rear license plate, 500 × 110 mm

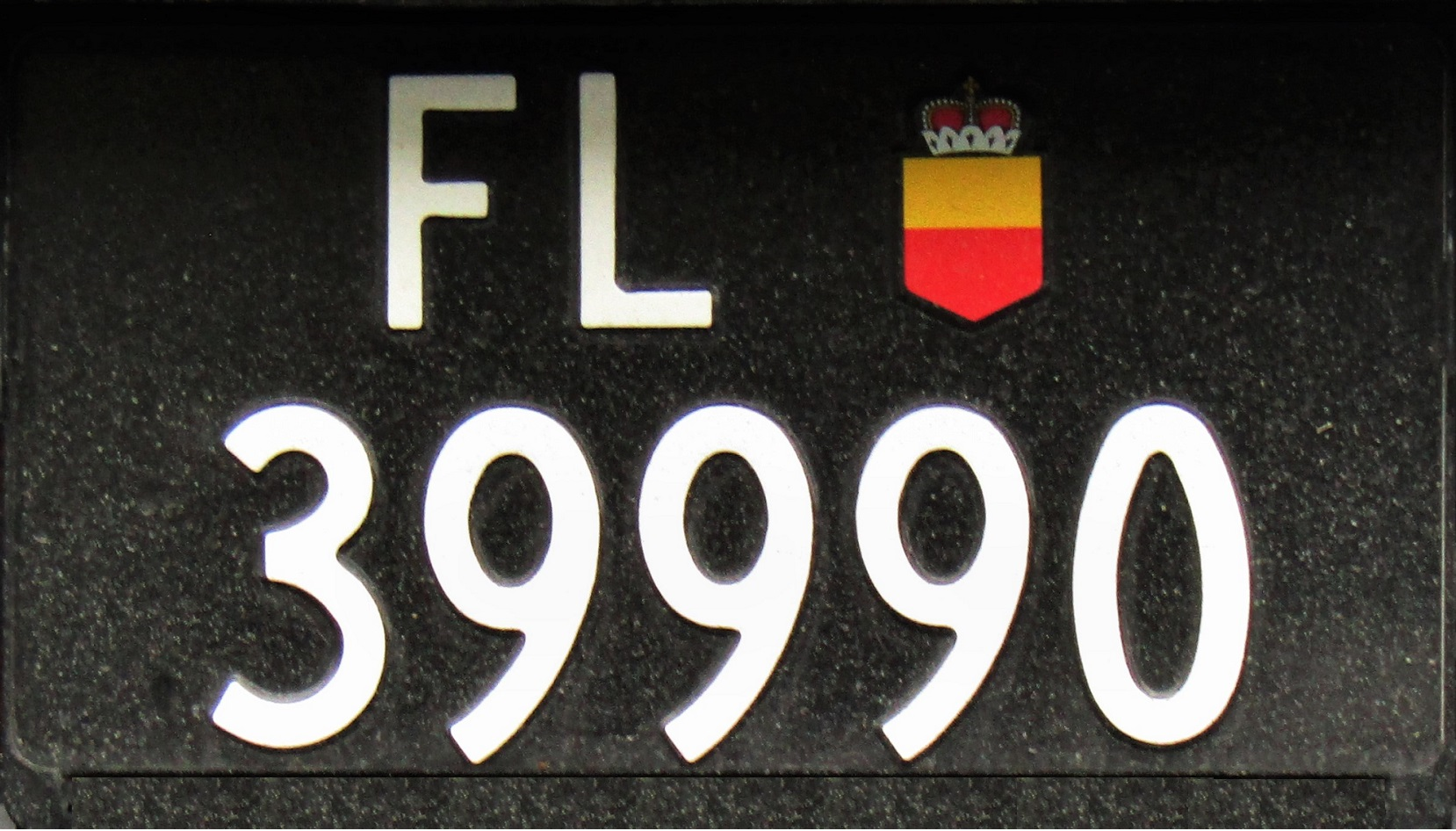
Rear license plate, 300 × 160 mm

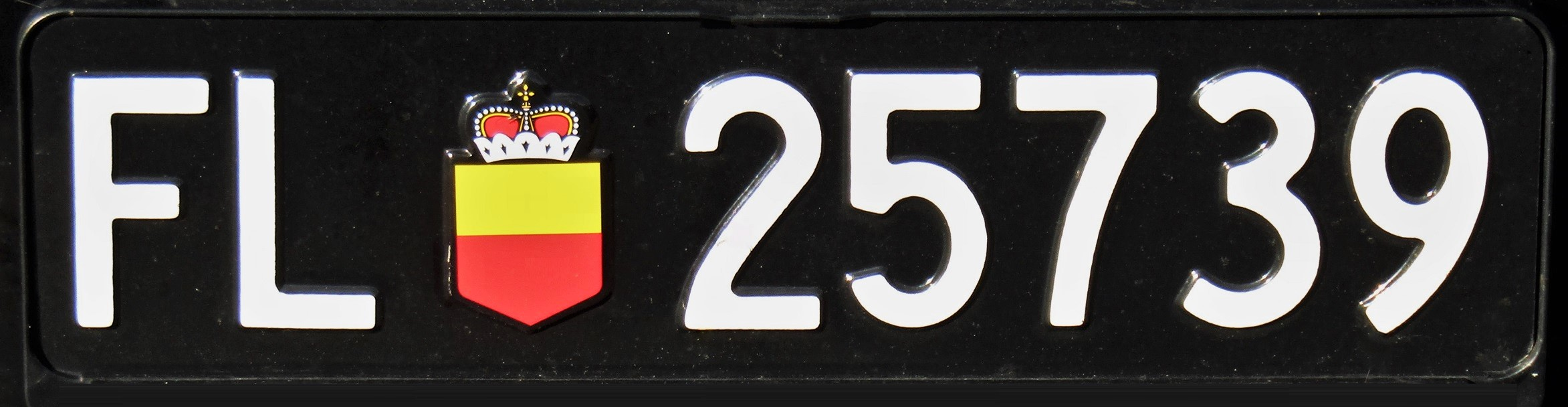
Front license plate, 300 × 80 mm

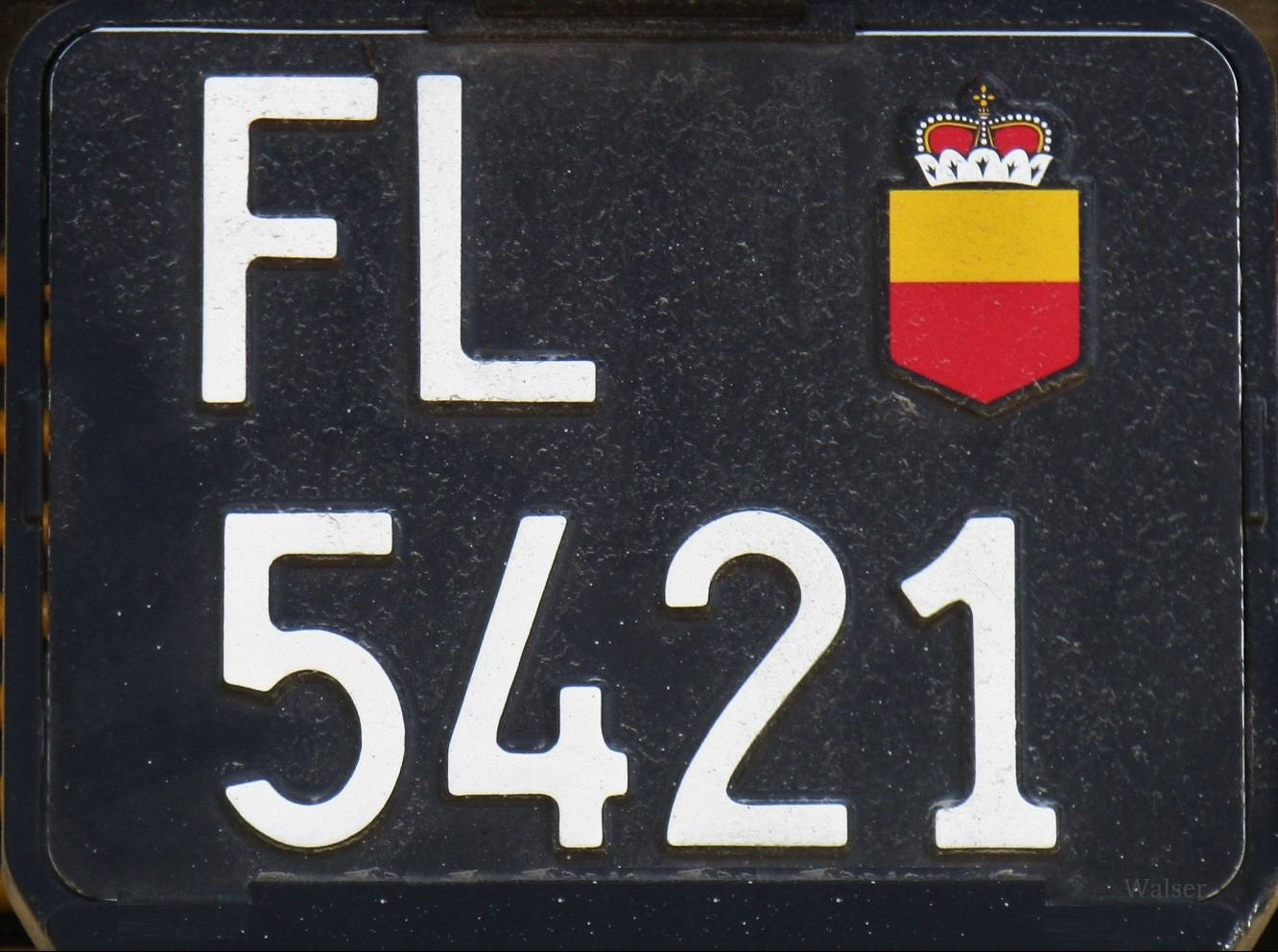
Motorcycle license plate, 180 × 140 mm

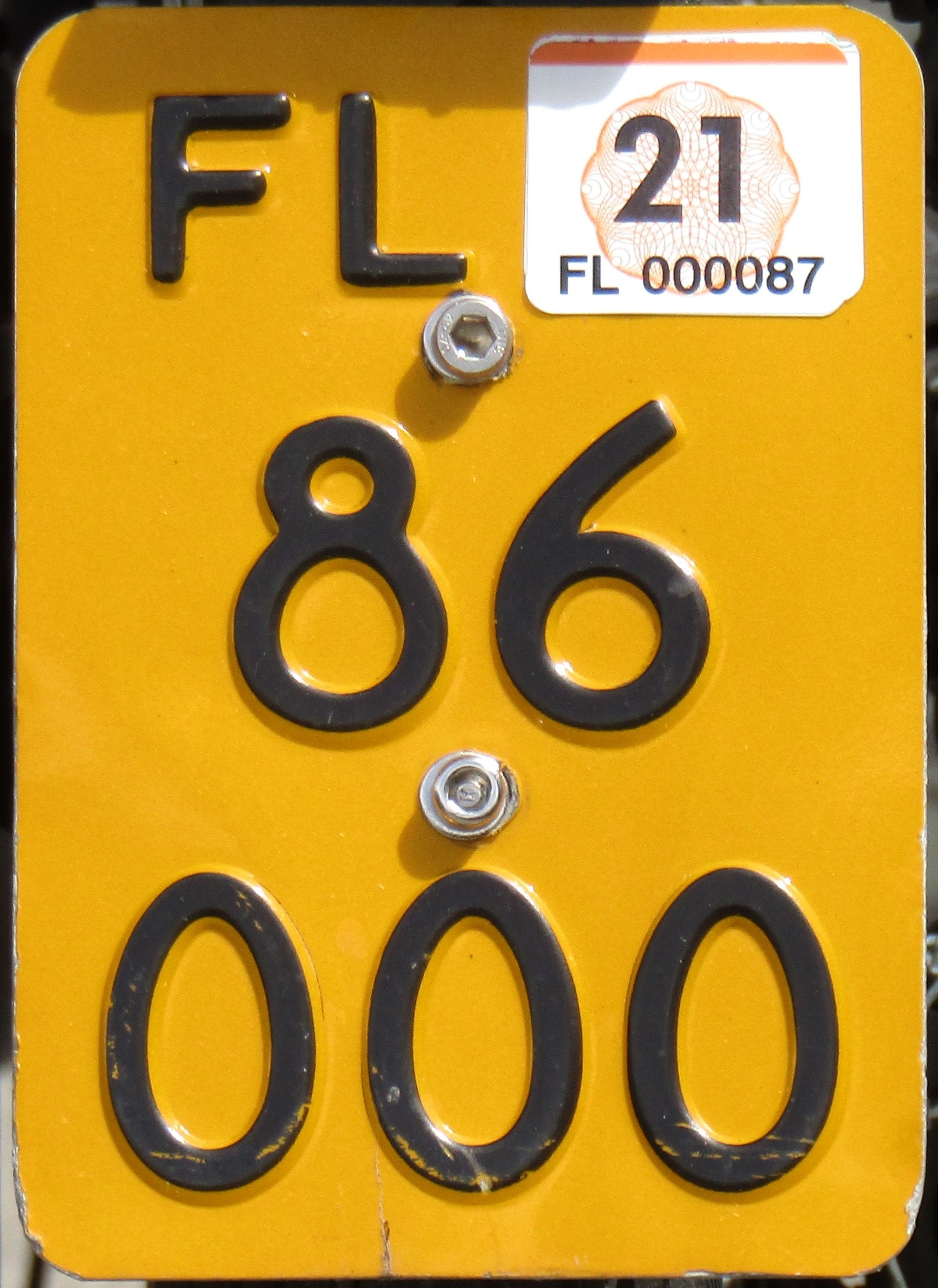
Moped and E-bike license plate, 100 × 140 mm

The license plates have the following formats, with the corners rounded with a radius of 1 cm:

- 500 × 110 mm are the dimensions of rectangular (long) rear license plates since 1987.
- 300 × 160 mm are the dimensions of square (high) rear license plates since 1972.
- Until 1959, rear license plates were only available in square format (310 × 240 mm).
- Since 1959, they have also been issued in long format upon request.
- Initially, their size was 380 × 110 mm, later 440 × 110 mm.
- 300 × 80 mm has been the standard size for front license plates since 1972.
- Until 1972, front license plates were 380 × 110 mm in size..
- 180 × 140 mm has been the standard format for license plates for motorcycles, scooters, trikes, quads, light vehicles, light motor vehicles, small motorcycles, light motorcycles, electric vehicles, and light electric vehicles since 1972.
- 100 × 140 mm has been the standard size for license plates for mopeds and e-bikes since 1972.

=== Manufacturing ===
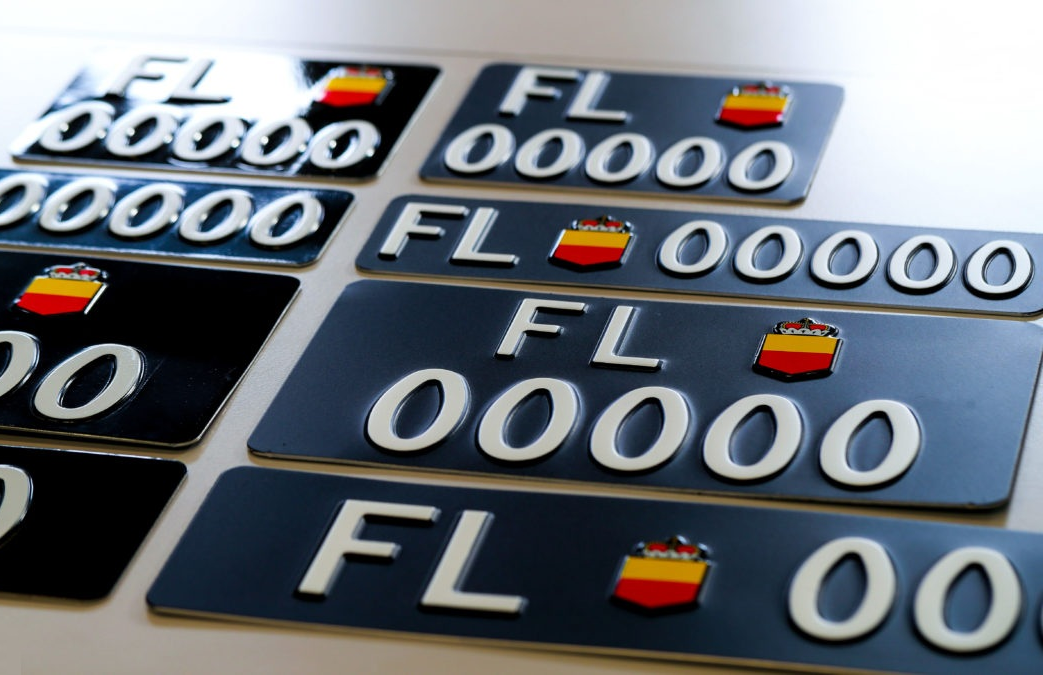
Liechtenstein license plates with an optional matte black base color

Liechtenstein license plates are manufactured in Switzerland, by Plaque Suisse, a company located in the canton of Solothurn. This company produces approximately one million license plates annually for 20 Swiss cantons and the Principality of Liechtenstein.

The production process for a black standard license plate of Liechtenstein begins with a 1.5 mm thick aluminium blank, which is covered with a black foil. The aluminium blank is placed in a forming press where the required numbers and letters are inserted. The characters and the outline of the national coat of arms are pressed into the blank under high pressure, raised to a height of 1.5 mm. The embossed black plate then passes through a hot stamping machine, where a pressure roller heated to approximately 200 °C transfers a white foil onto the embossed characters. The national coat of arms, or rather its outline, is covered during this process and thus remains black. The national coat of arms is subsequently affixed to the plate as a sticker.

Liechtenstein license plates can be coated with a reflective or photoluminescent material. Since January 2019, license plates with a matte black base color (black paint without gloss, which absorbs light instead of reflecting it) have also been produced upon request. A single matte black license plate for motorcycles costs CHF 130, and two matte black license plates for cars cost CHF 250. A standard license plate costs CHF 25, and two standard plates cost CHF 40.

== Temporary license plates ==
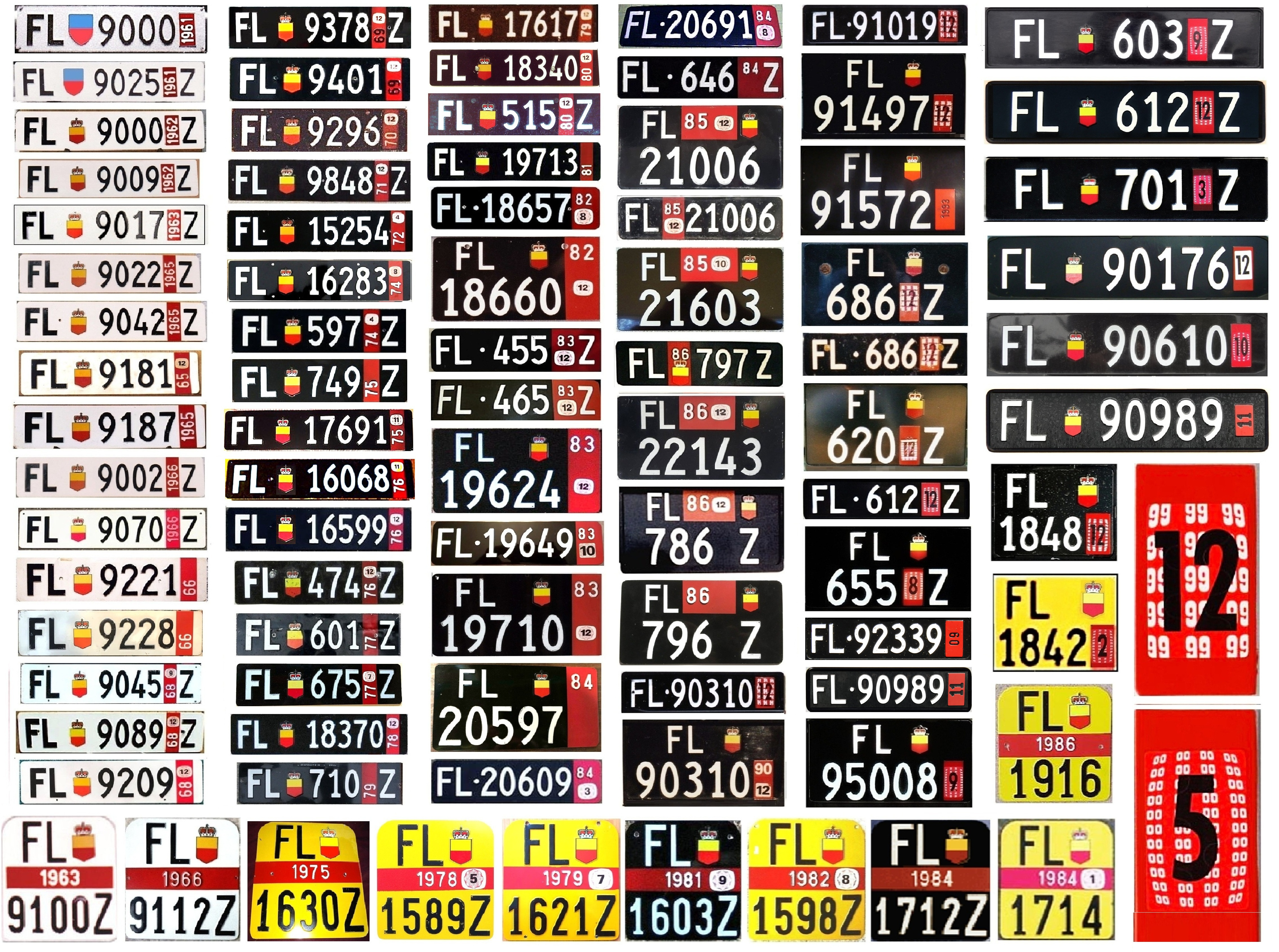
Development of temporary license plates in Liechtenstein since 1960

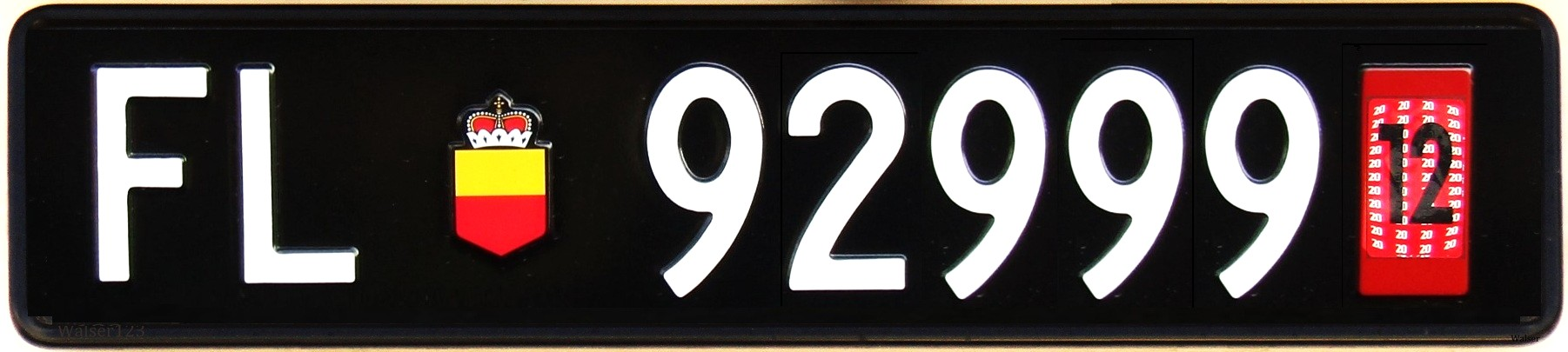
Temporary Liechtenstein license plate, rear plate, long format.

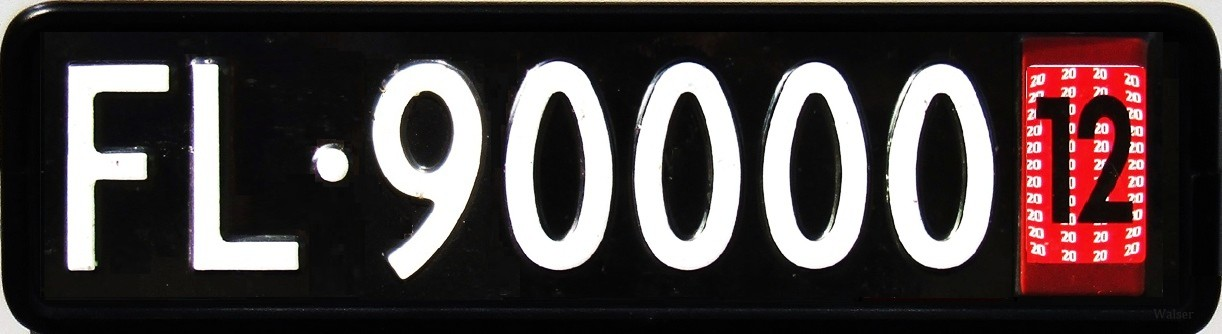
Temporary Liechtenstein license plate, front plates are showing a dot instead of the national coat of arms.

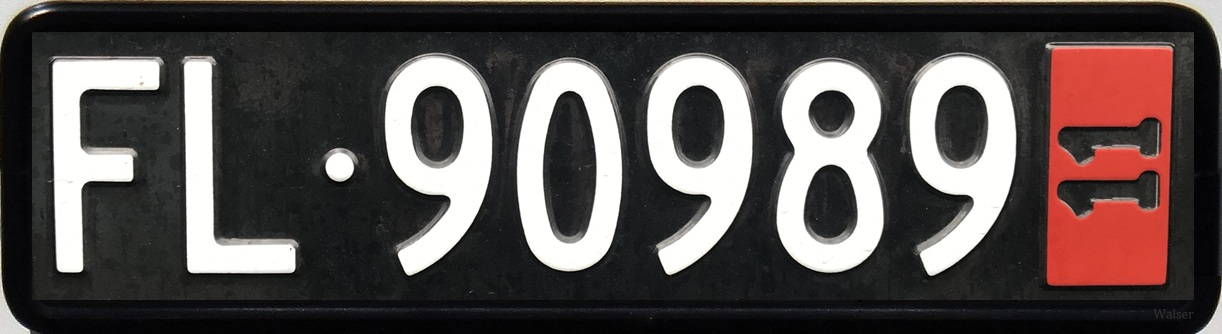
Temporary Liechtenstein license plate, front plates are showing a dot instead of the national coat of arms.

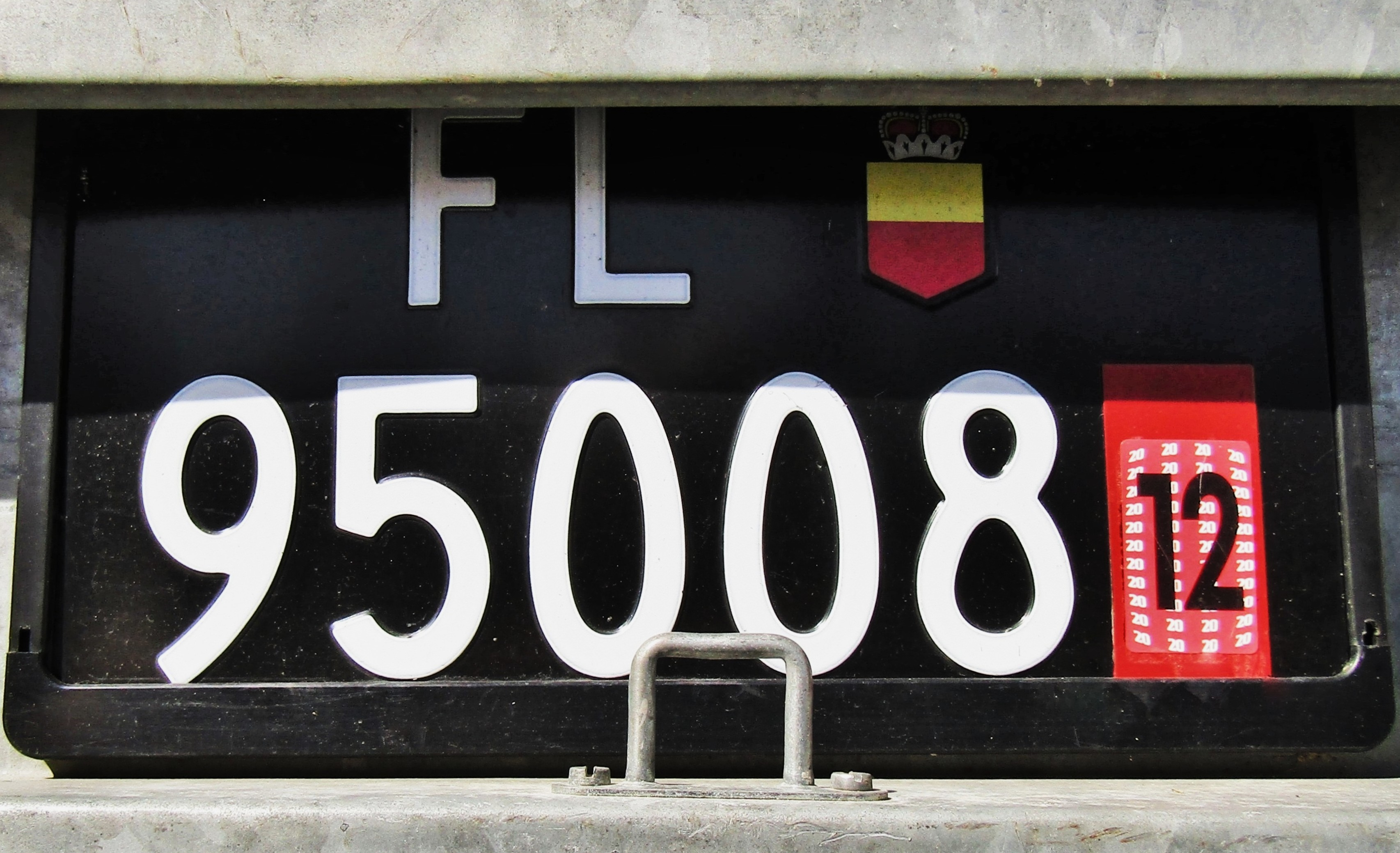
Temporary Liechtenstein traler license plate in a square format, temporary trailer plates bear numbers above 95000.

Since 1960, Liechtenstein has issued temporary license plates for motor vehicles that have cleared customs but are only temporarily registered in Liechtenstein. These plates are valid for a maximum of one year, and all taxes and fees must be paid in advance. Motor vehicles receive temporary license plates with numbers between FL 90000 and FL 92999. Trailers receive plates with numbers starting at FL 95000, and motorcycles receive temporary plates with numbers starting at FL 1800.

The license plates for provisionally registered motor vehicles bear a raised, vertical red bar following the control number. Plates for vehicles that have not yet cleared customs also bear the letter "Z". On temporary front plates for cars and on temporary plates for motorcycles, the red bar is 33 mm wide and 67 mm high; on the rear plates for cars, it is 36 mm wide and 75 mm high. The two-digit year of the year preceding the expiry year is debossed on the red bar. A control sticker is affixed to the red bar, bearing the number of the expiry month and the last two digits of the expiry year.

The control sticker is 5 cm high and 3 cm wide. Its background color is red, and the last two digits of the expiry year are repeatedly printed in small white lettering on the sticker. The expiry month is printed in black in the center of the sticker. The numbers of temporary license plates are constantly reassigned after the expiry of their validity period or when the vehicle registration is cancelled. The numbering process usually restarts after two years, beginning with the lowest available number of the allocated number range. Temporary license plates do not necessarily have to be returned after their expiry date. However, in cases of misuse, the license plates must be officially confiscated.

=== Customs license plates ===
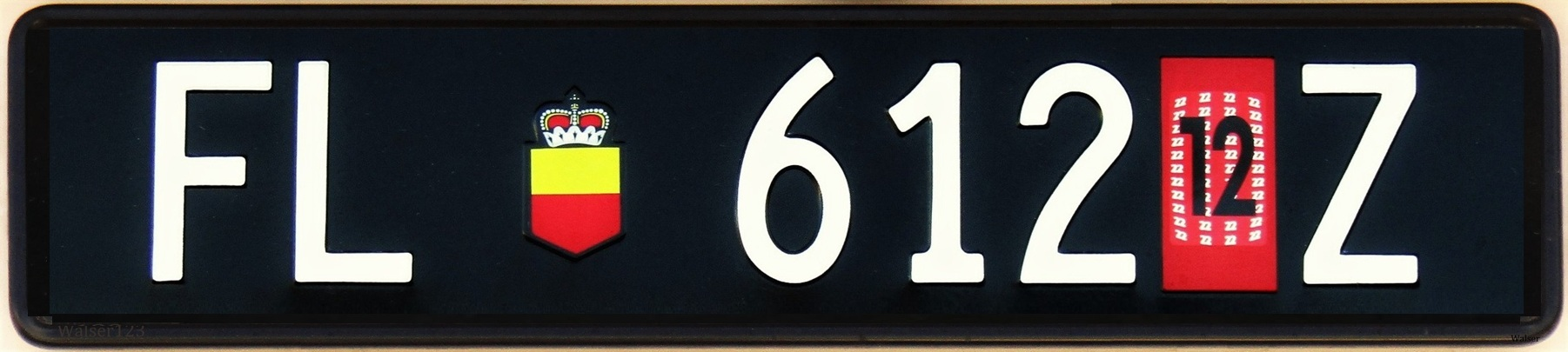
Temporary customs license plate, for uncleared motor vehicles, rear plate in long format.

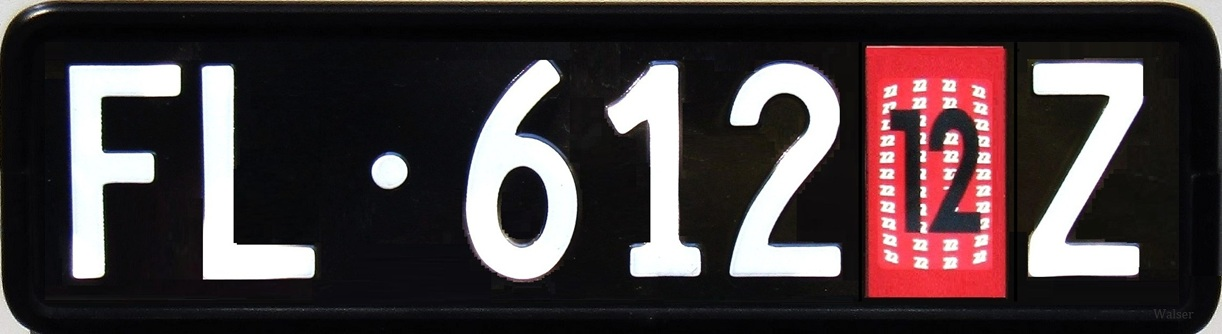
Temporary customs license plate for uncleared motor vehicles. For space reasons, front customs plates display a dot instead of the national coat of arms.

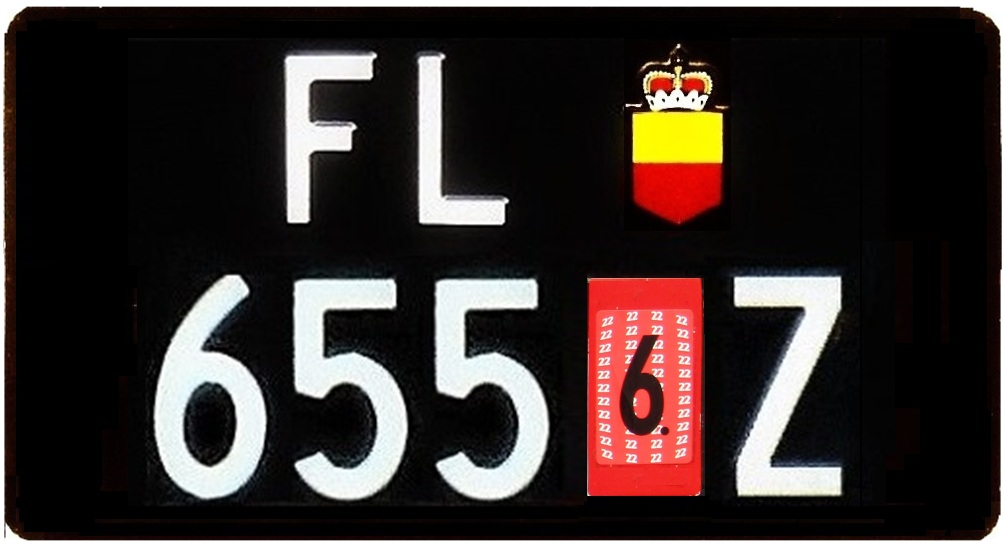
Temporary customs number plate for uncleared motor vehicles, rear plate in a square format.

Customs license plates are for motor vehicles and trailers that have not yet been cleared through customs and are temporarily stationed in Liechtenstein. They are designed like temporary license plates, but additionally have the letter "Z" for customs (German: Zoll) printed in white to the right of the red stripe. For space reasons, front plates only show a dot between the letters and the number instead of the national coat of arms. The numbering of customs license plates begins with FL 600 Z for motor vehicles and FL 700 Z for trailers.

The numbering process restarts every two years with the lowest available number. Customs license plates do not need to be returned after the expiry date, but must be officially confiscated if misused. Temporary license plates and customs license plates are issued to natural persons (foreigners holding a short-term residence permit and third-country nationals who have not yet held a residence permit for two years) and legal persons not operating in Liechtenstein, or persons with a foreign residence and a vehicle location address in Liechtenstein.

=== Short-term license plates ===
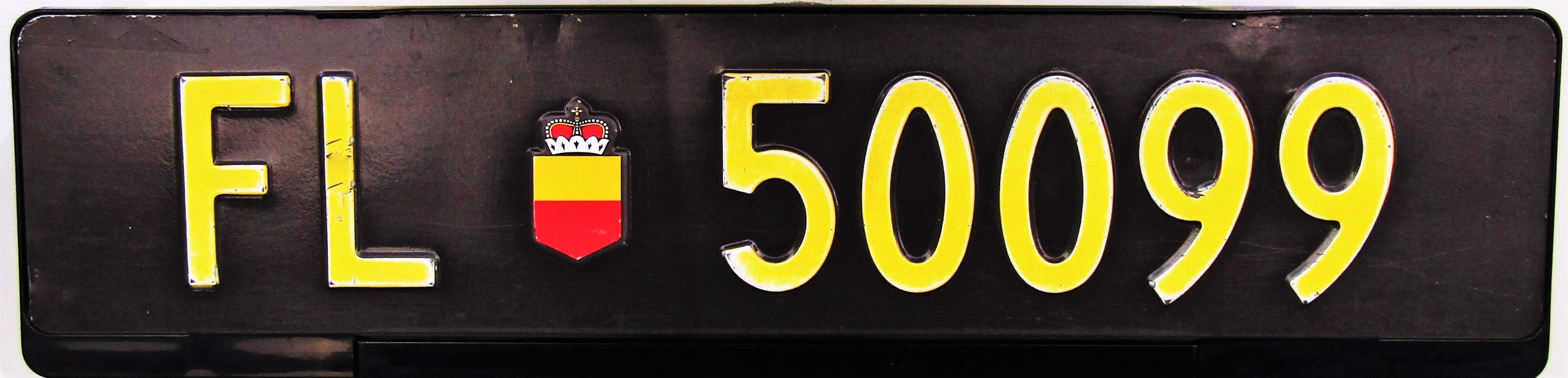
Short-term registration plate, rear plate, long format.

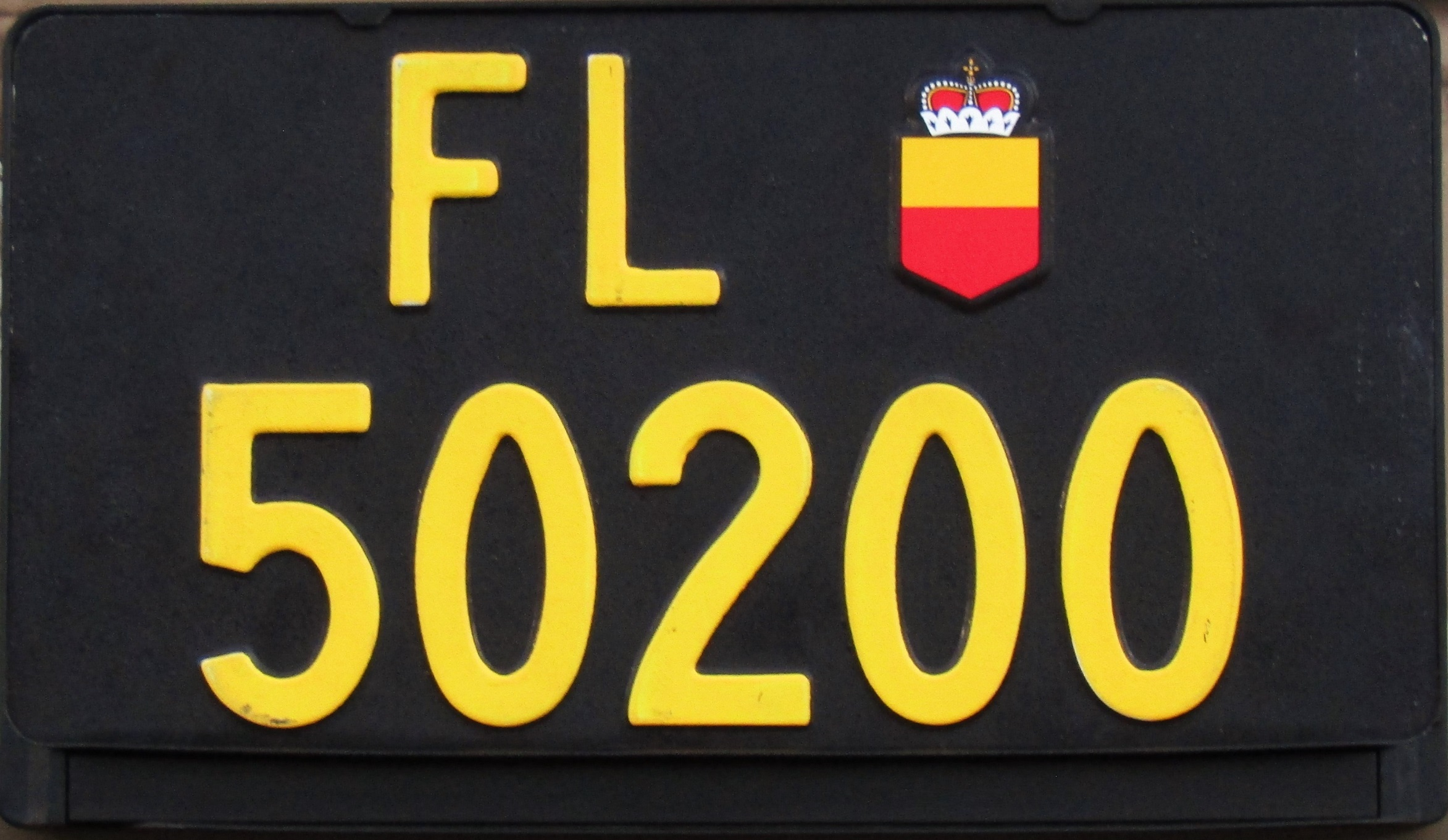
Short-term registration plate, rear plate, square format.

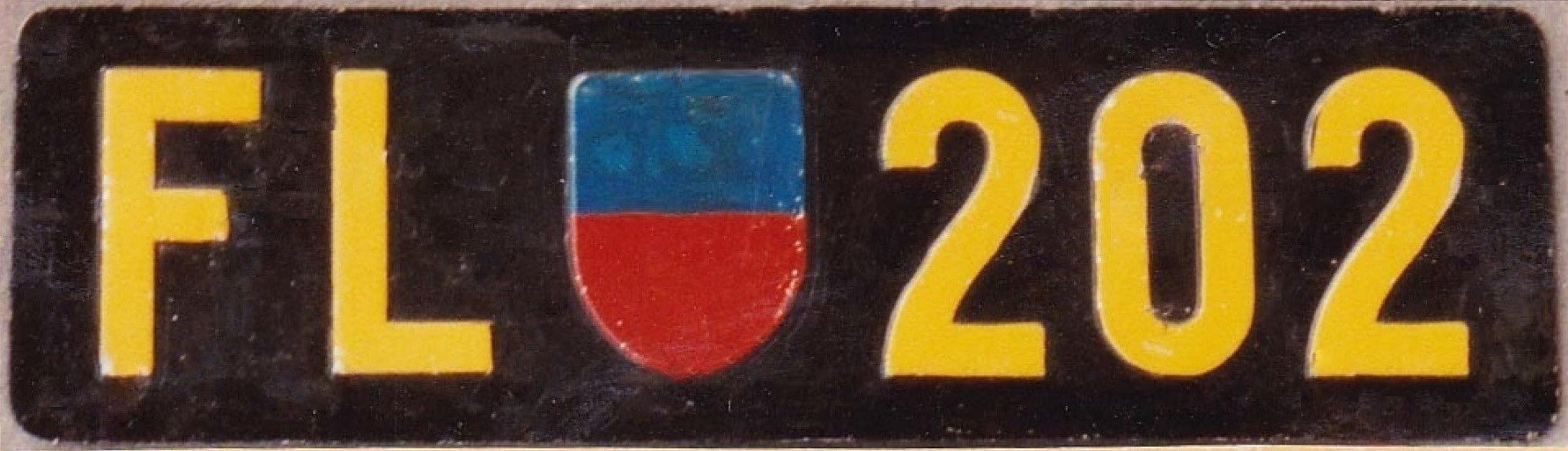
Short-term registration plate, 1924-1961.

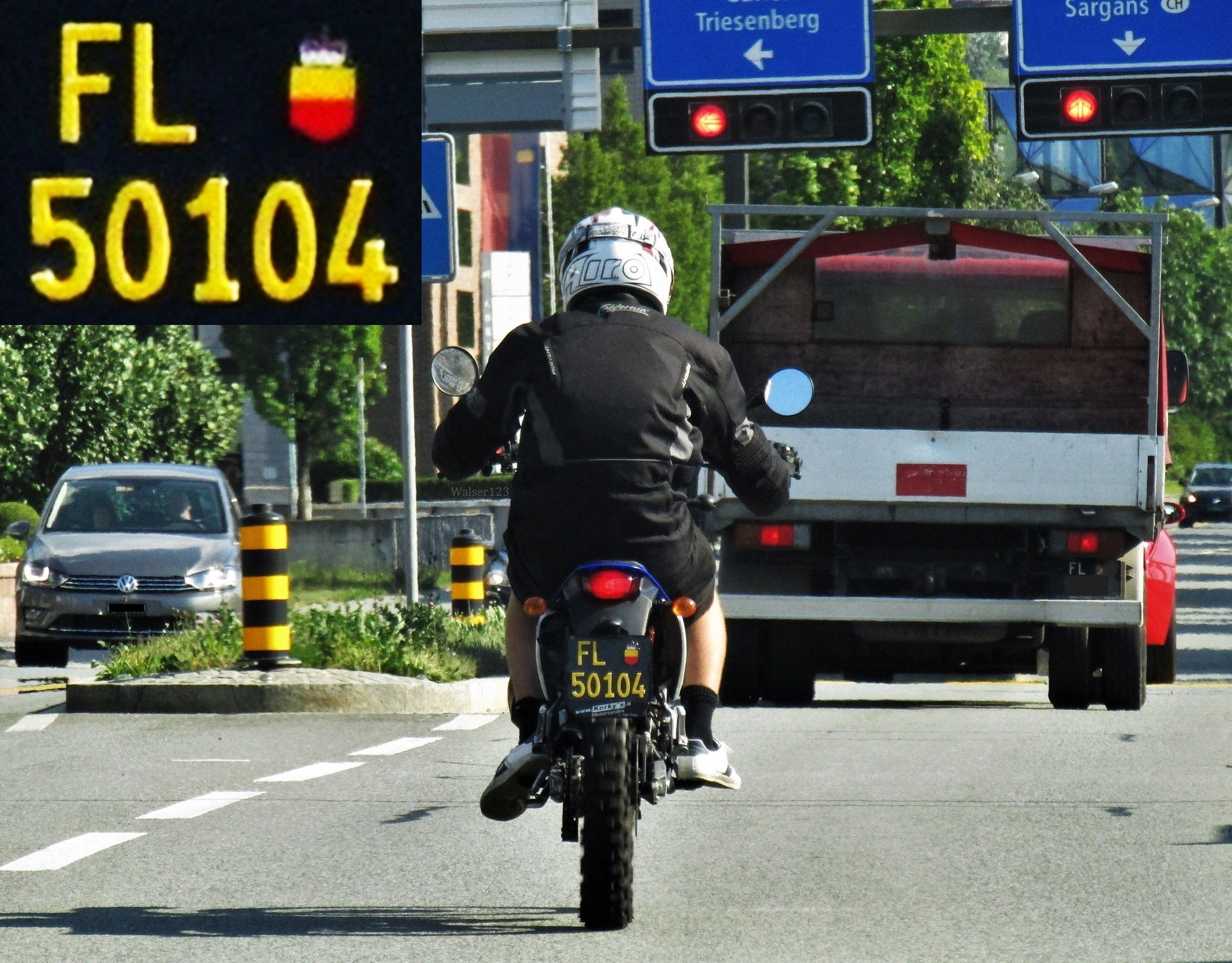
Short-term motorcycle license plate.

Short-term license plates display yellow characters on a black background and bear numbers between FL 50000 and FL 50299. These plates are issued for a validity period of 24, 48, 72, or 96 hours. Validity begins upon issuance of the plate. Upon expiry, the short-term plates and the vehicle registration document must be returned immediately, either in person or by mail. Short-term registration plates are valid only in Liechtenstein and Switzerland. The cost for a short-term registration, including third-party liability insurance, is approximately CHF 30 per day for trailers, CHF 40 per day for motorcycles, CHF 50 for passenger cars, and CHF 60 per day for trucks. A deposit of CHF 200 is also required.

A vehicle displaying short-term license plates may only be used for journeys free of charge and may not be rented out. A maximum of eight people may be in such a vehicle. Goods transport may not be carried out with vehicles subject to the heavy vehicle tax. A vehicle put into service with short-term license plates must be roadworthy and comply with the technical requirements for road vehicles. The steering, lights, and brakes must function properly, the tire tread depth must be at least 1.6 mm, and the bodywork must not have any defects that significantly affect road safety. If the last inspection date is outside the legally prescribed period, the vehicle must undergo a roadworthiness test before the short-term license plates are issued.

== License plates for special purposes ==
=== Dealer license plates ===
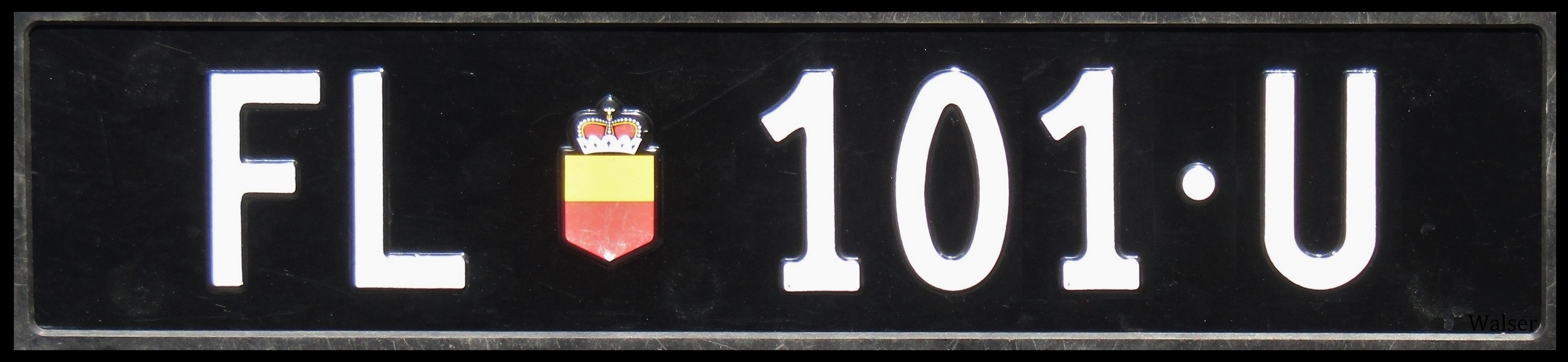
Dealer license plate, rear plate.

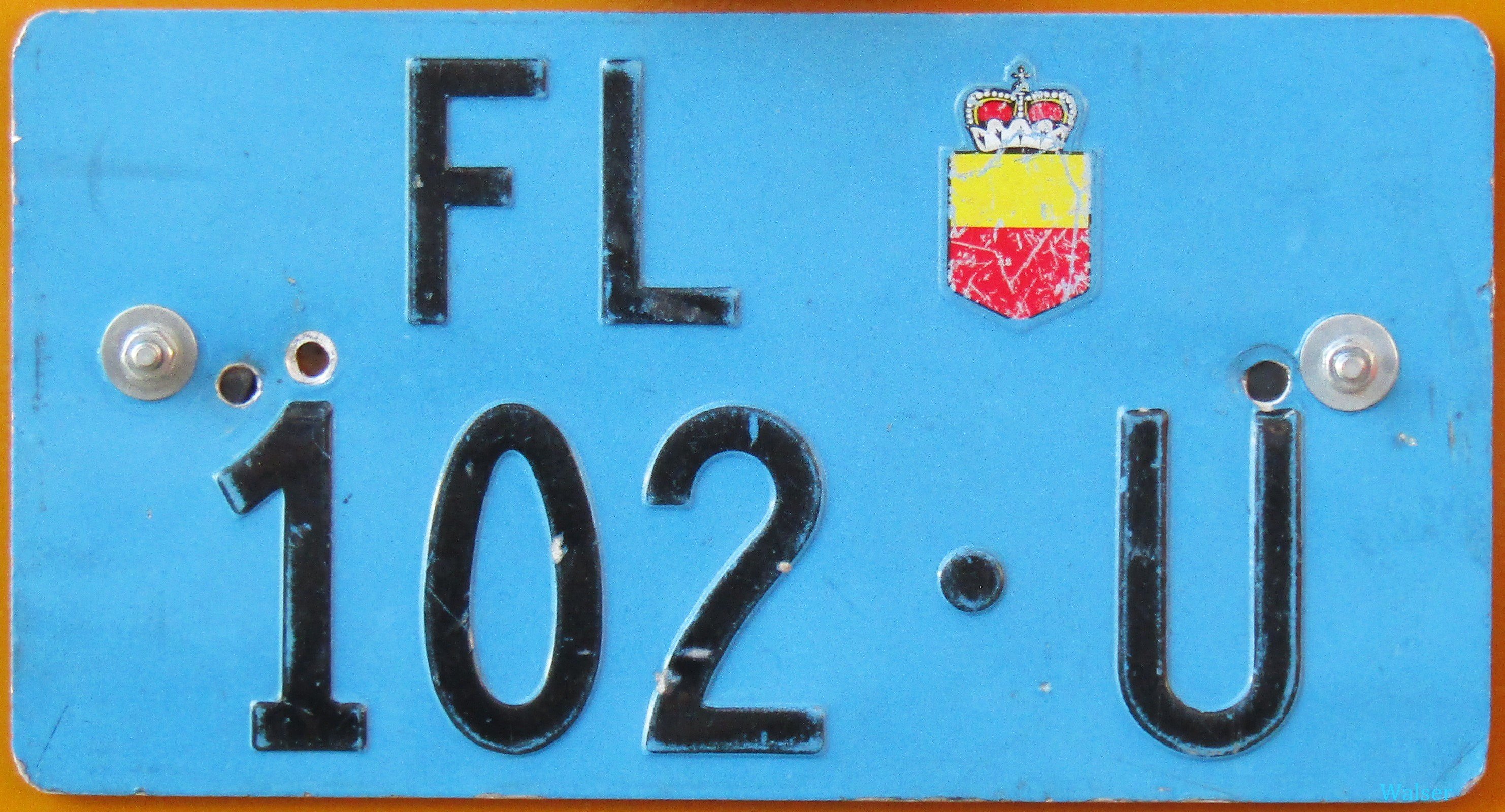
Liechtenstein dealer license plate, with light blue background for utility and industrial vehicles.

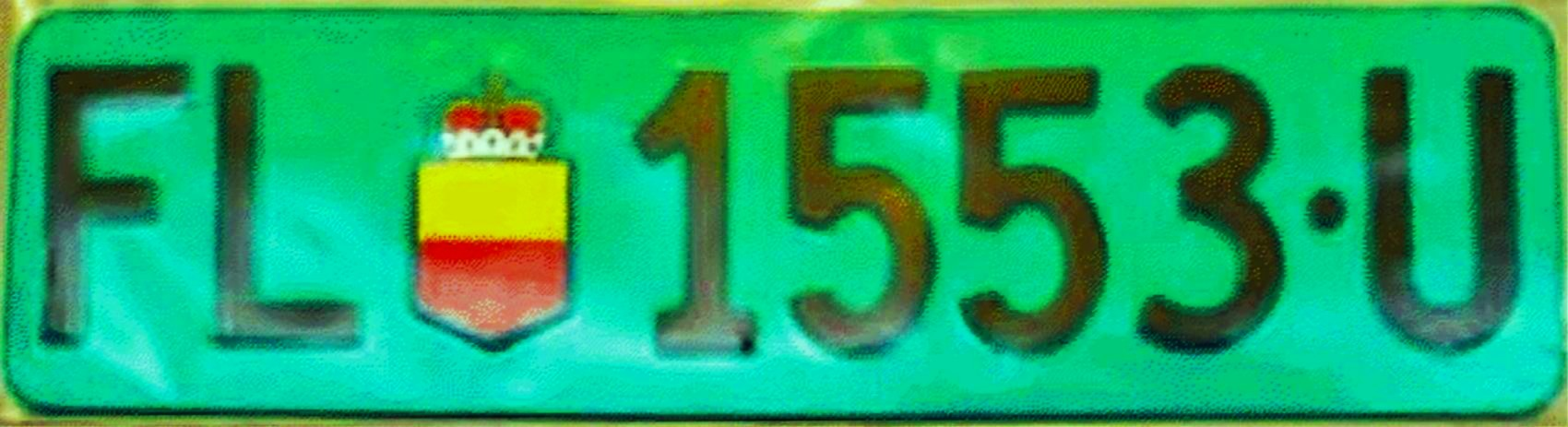
Liechtenstein dealer license plate, with green background for agricultural vehicles

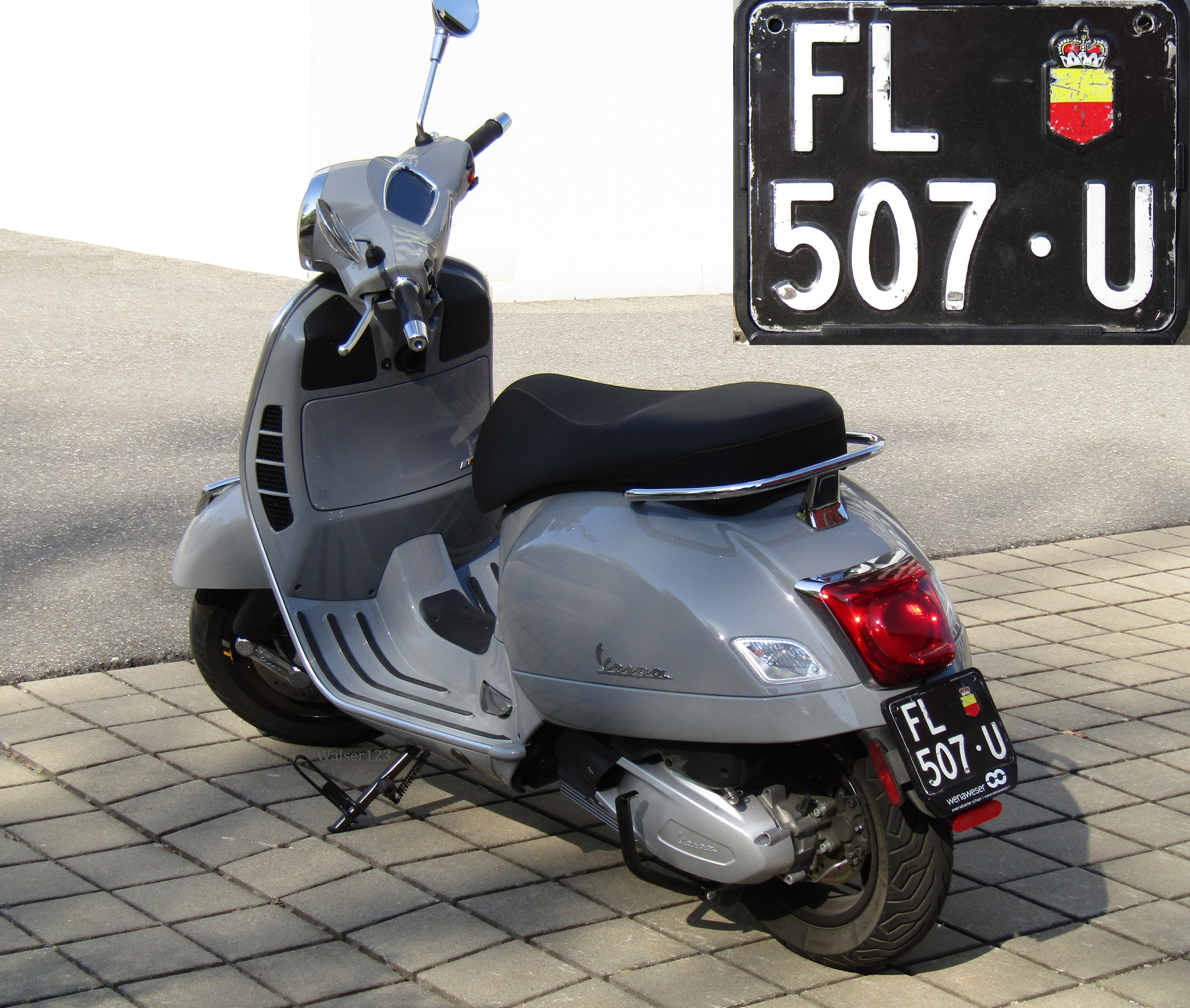
Motorcycle dealer license plate.

License plates with numbers from FL 101 to FL 300 and the additional letter "U" are special license plates for the motor vehicle trade. The letter "U" stands for "Unternehmer" (business). These plates, colloquially also called "garage plates" or "U-plates," are only issued to registered vehicle dealers and automobile repair shops in conjunction with a collective vehicle registration document. Dealer plates can be used temporarily for all motor vehicles, e. g., for inspection and transfer journeys, regardless of their engine power and emissions. For work vehicles and exceptional vehicles, dealer plates with a blue background color are being used. The numbering also begins with FL 101 U. Dealer plates with a green background are available for agricultural and forestry vehicles. For motorcycle dealer plates, the numbering begins with FL 501 U.

In addition to attaching them to regular license plate holders, these "U-numbers" can also be affixed magnetically to the hood and rear or suspended from a plastic bag. Vehicles bearing dealer plates can be made available to prospective buyers for unaccompanied test drives, provided they are roadworthy and comply with regulations. Motorway use without a toll sticker is permitted for motorway-legal vehicles; however, driving abroad is not allowed, as these special plates are not required to be recognized under the Vienna Convention on Road Traffic. The Vienna Convention only requires the recognition of license plates officially assigned to a vehicle. Garage plates, however, are not assigned by the authorities but by the garage owner; the garage owner is responsible for the vehicle's roadworthiness (since such a vehicle, while roadworthy, does not necessarily have to undergo a vehicle inspection).

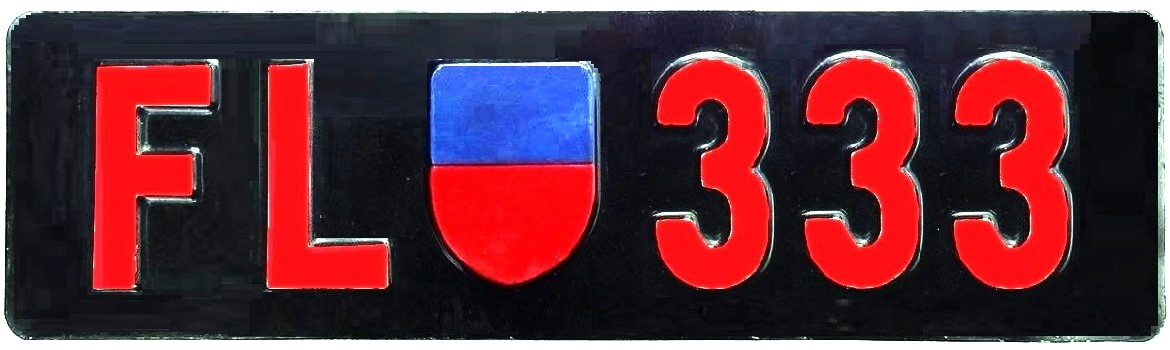
Dealer license plate, issued between 1933 and 1977.

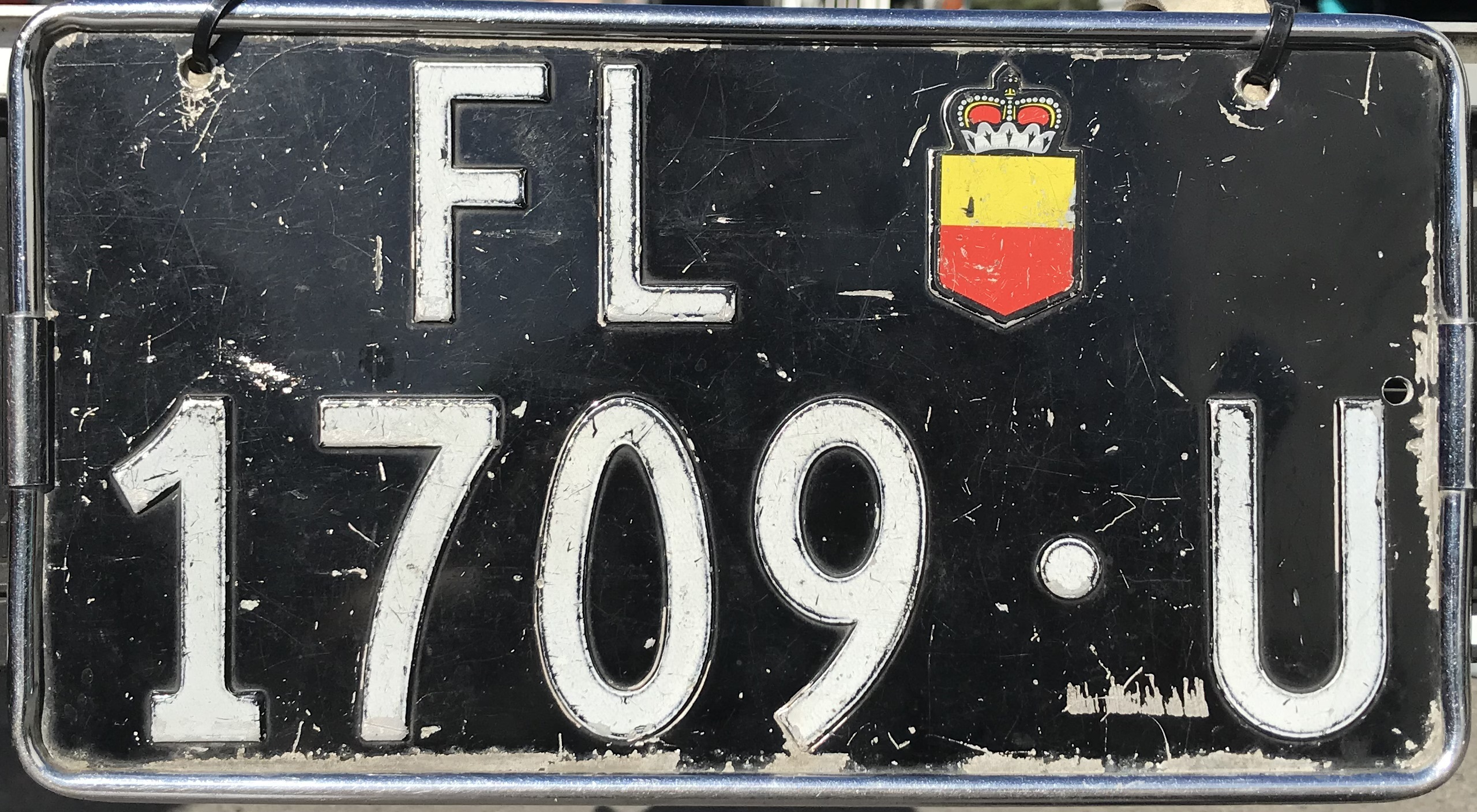
Liechtenstein dealer license plate, special series for trailers (FL 17××·U), introduced in 1977, discontinued in 2001.

Between 1933 and 1976, dealer license plates had the same format as normal plates but with red characters on a black background. Between 1977 and 2001, there were special dealer plates for trailers with four-digit numbers, the number series started with FL 1700 U. These dealer plates for trailers have not been issued since 2001, but existing plates are still valid. Since 2001, regular dealer plates (FL 101 U to FL 300 U) have been used for trailers. The front plate is attached to the towing vehicle and the rear plate to the trailer.

=== Agricultural vehicles ===
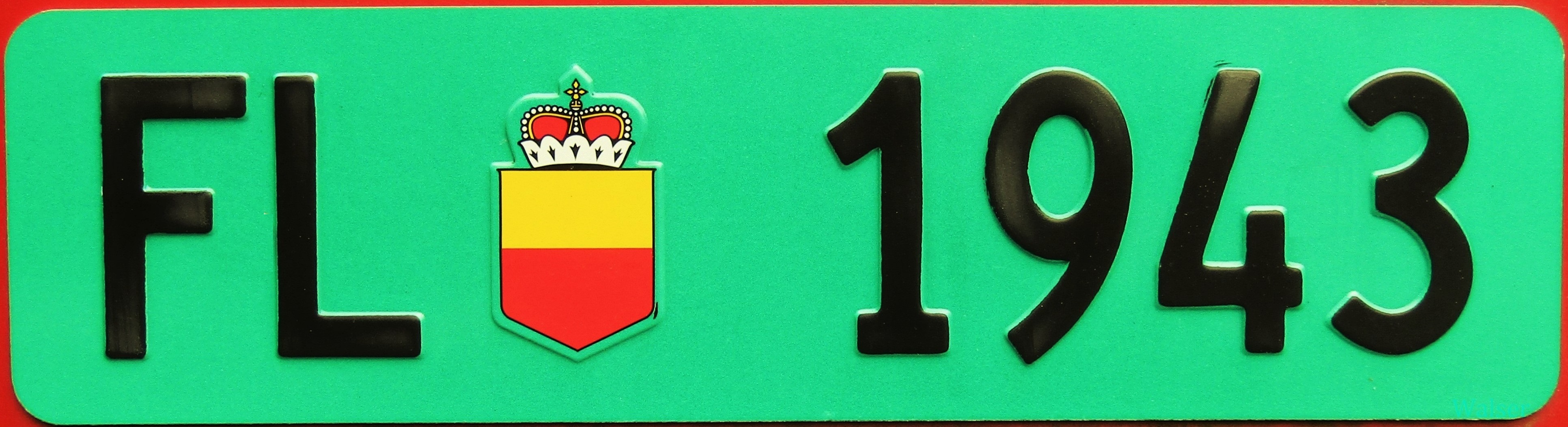
Green Liechtenstein license plate for agricultural and forestry vehicles, front plates only.

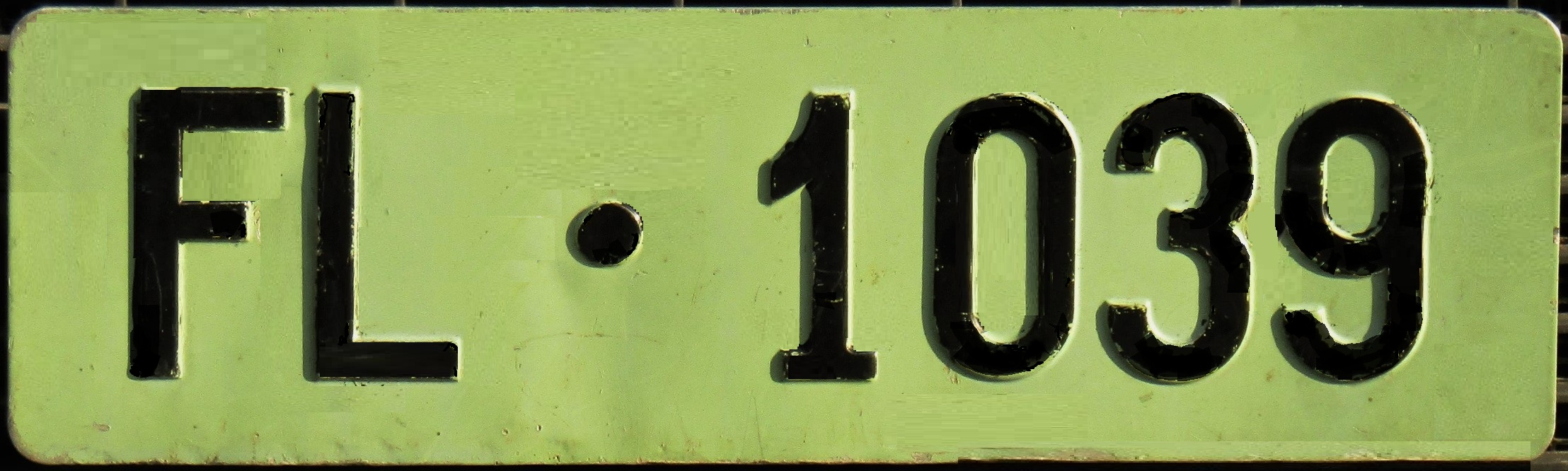
Green Liechtenstein license plate for agricultural and forestry vehicles, older series.

Green license plates with black lettering and numbers between FL 21 and FL 2000 are issued to agricultural vehicles, such as tractors, as well as forestry vehicles and their trailers. These vehicles may not be used for commercial journeys and must be limited to a maximum speed of 40 km/h. Only one front license plate is issued per vehicle, which can be mounted either at the front or rear. As of June 30, 2025, a total of 985 agricultural vehicles and trailers were registered for road use in Liechtenstein.

=== Utility vehicles ===
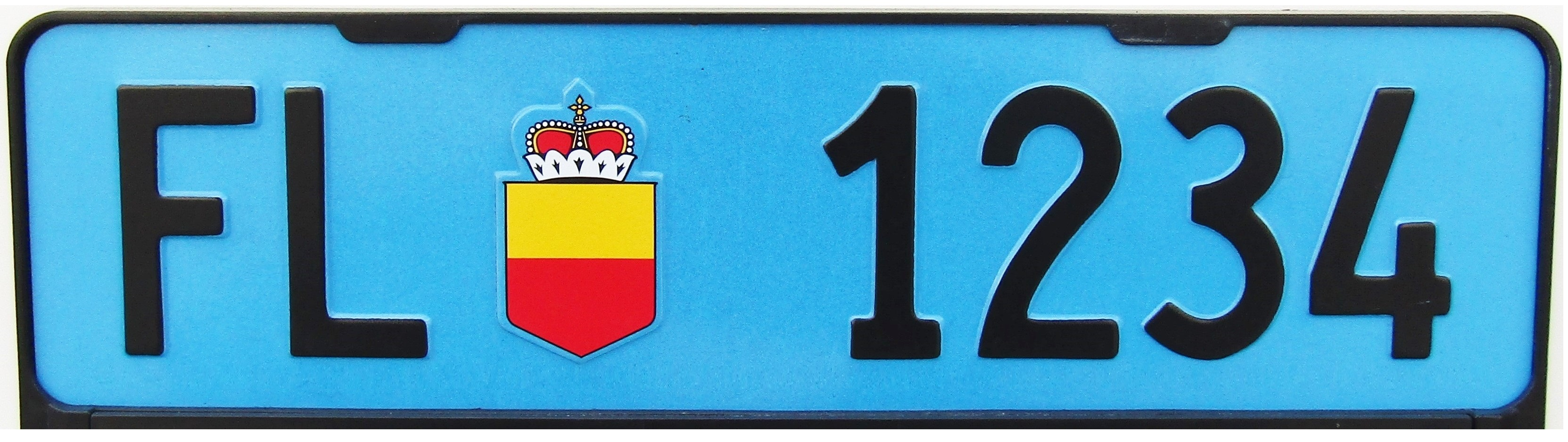
Light blue Liechtenstein license plate for utility and industrial vehicles and trailers.

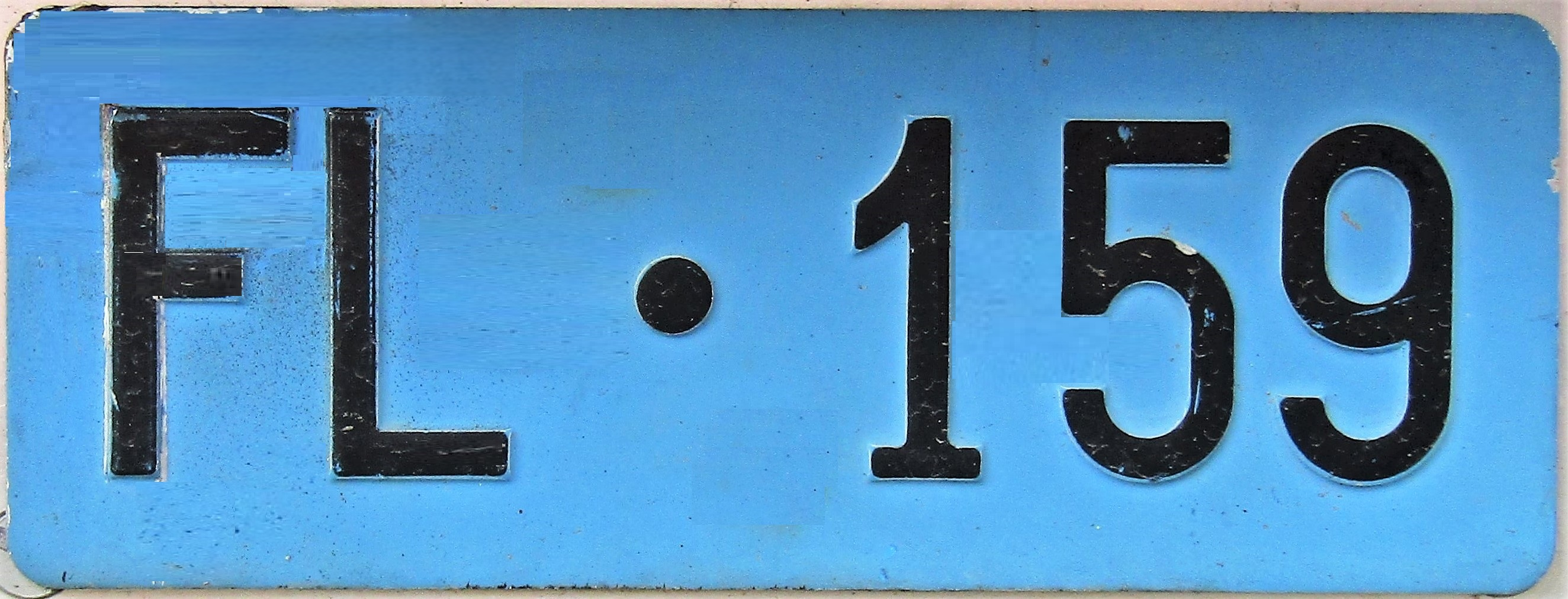
Utility vehicle license plate, older series.

License plates with a light blue background and black lettering, with numbers between FL 21 and FL 2000, are issued for vehicles and trailers that do not transport goods but are used exclusively for work, such as fire engines, vehicles and trailers used in civil engineering and construction, forestry, or road maintenance, such as snowplows, street sweepers, etc. As of June 30, 2025, a total of 879 work and industrial vehicles and trailers were registered in Liechtenstein.

=== Exceptional vehicles ===
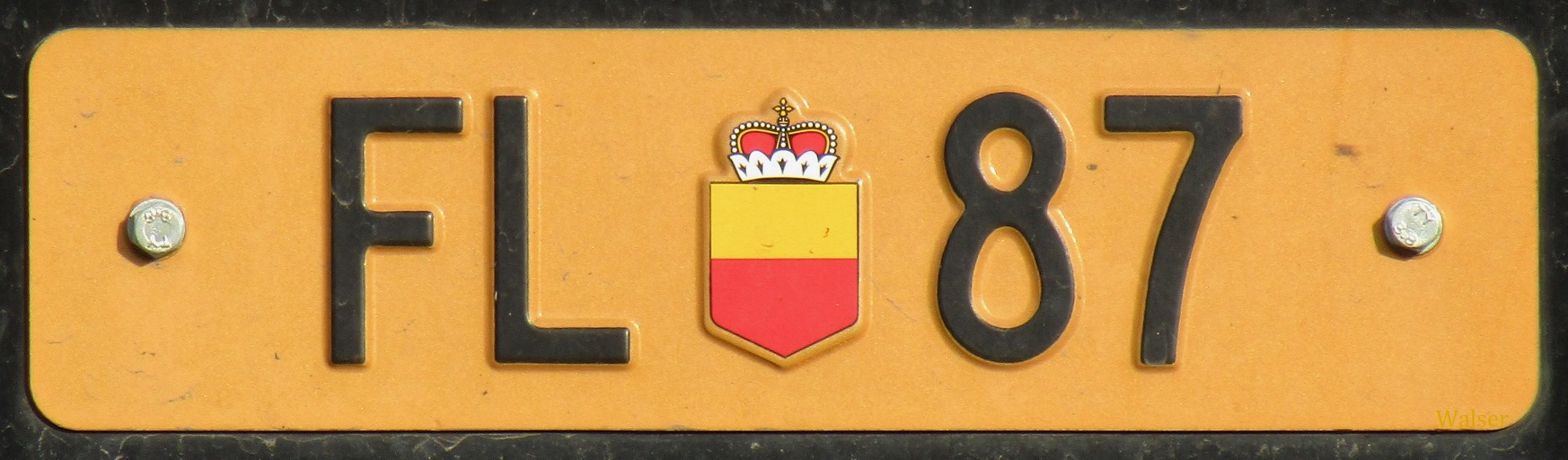
Light brown Liechtenstein license plate for exceptional vehicles and trailers, front plate.

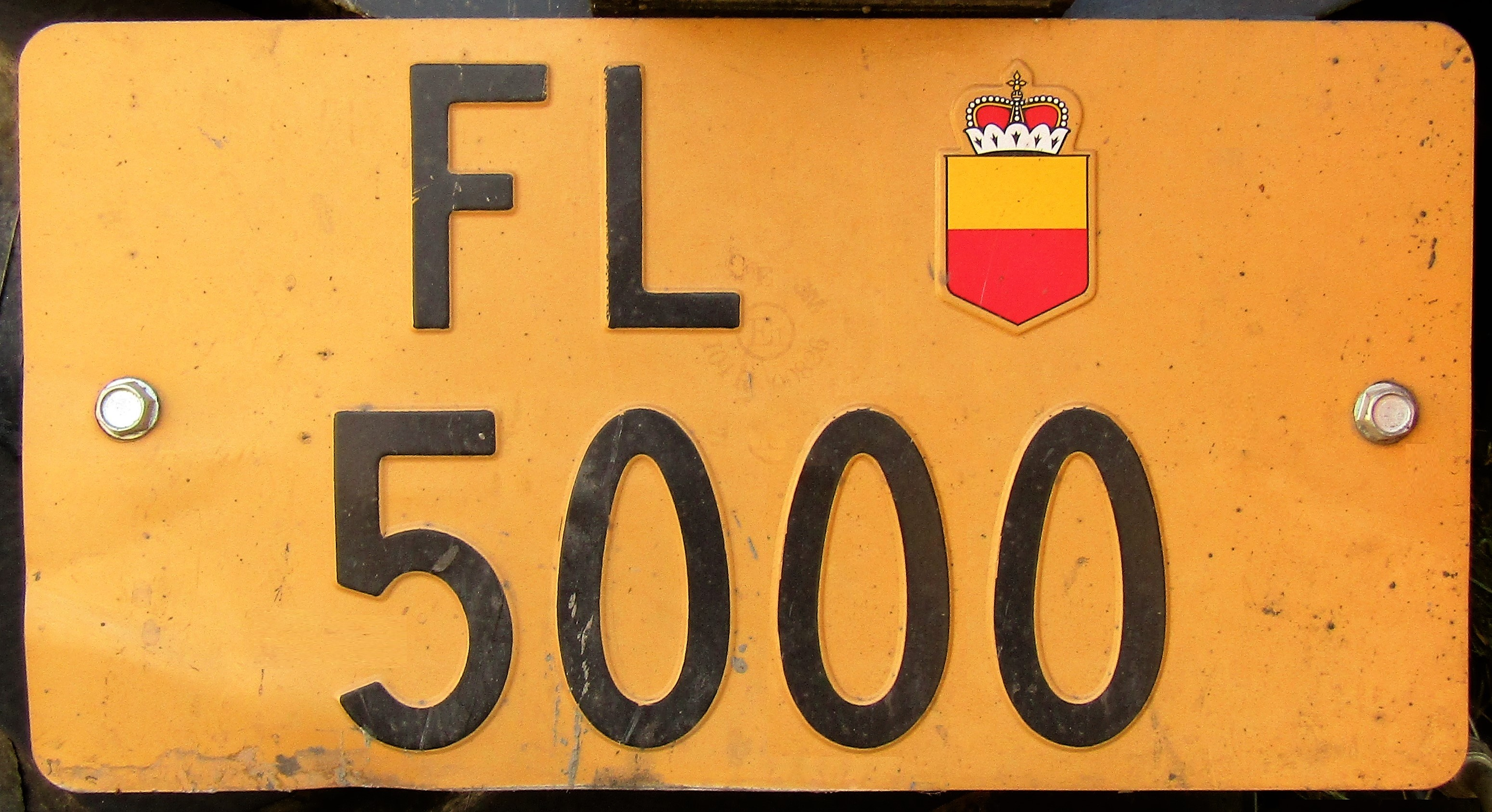
Light brown Liechtenstein license plate for exceptional vehicles and trailers, trailers display a single plate numbered above 5000.

License plates with a light brown background and black lettering are issued for unusual vehicles and trailers, so-called exceptional vehicles, which, due to their design or intended use, do not comply with the general regulations regarding weight and size. Such vehicles may only be driven with a special written permit. This category includes, for example, crane trucks, heavy excavators, oversized tractors, heavy transport vehicles and trailers, etc. The numbering on these plates also begins at FL 21. Trailers receive license plates with numbers above FL 5000.

=== Repeater license plates ===
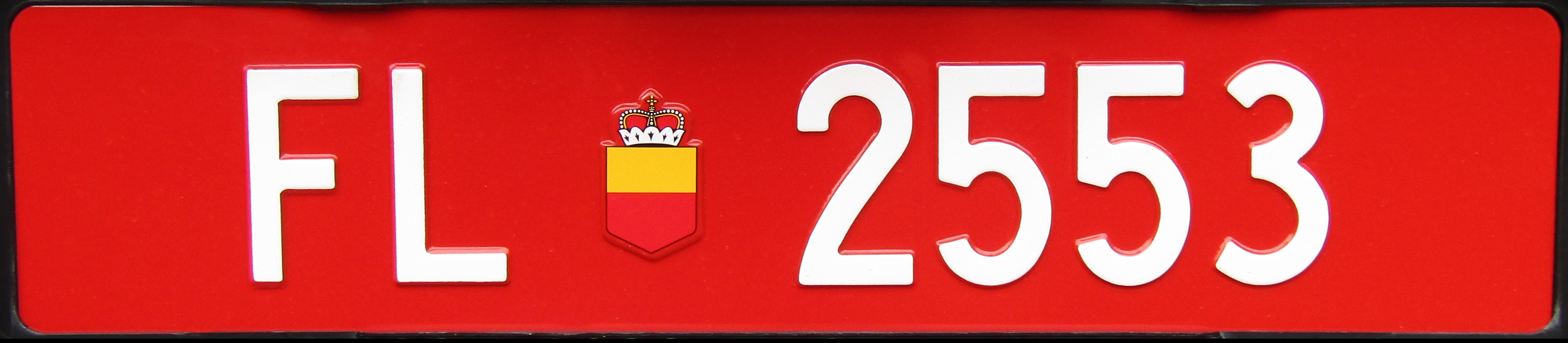
Liechtenstein repeater license plate / "third license plate" for rear load carriers.

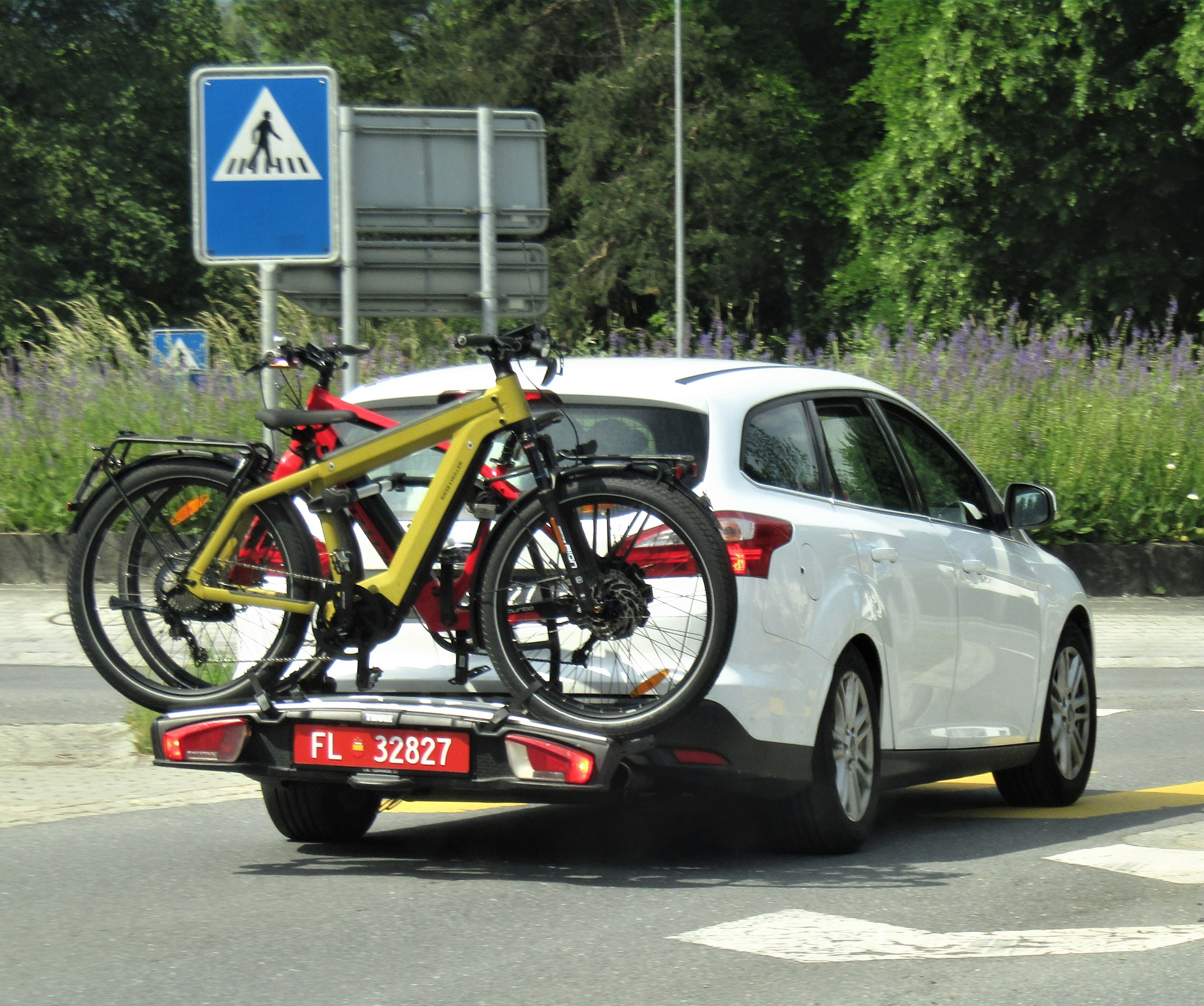
Vehicle with a red repeater license plate / "third license plate" for rear load carriers.

On October 5, 2021, the government of Liechtenstein amended several regulations of the Road Traffic Act. Among other things, the amendments introduced a "third license plate" for towbars. Since March 1, 2022, it has been possible to obtain a red license plate for mounting on the rear towbar from the National Road Office; this plate is also recognized abroad. Previously, the black rear license plate had to be mounted on the towbar if it obscured the rear license plate on the vehicle. This is no longer necessary, as the new license plate only needs to be attached once when the towbar is in use and can then remain there. The third license plate has a red background with white lettering. It is issued exclusively in the long rectangular format.

The price of a red license plate is CHF 25. The corresponding entry in the vehicle registration document costs CHF 20. Purchasing the license plate is voluntary. It remains permissible to mount the rear black license plate on the cargo carrier. The new red license plate may only be used together with the main pair of plates. Liechtenstein introduced the third license plate at the same time as Switzerland. Since March 1, 2022, it can be ordered exclusively by email from the National Road Office. Delivery is made according to the order in which orders are received.

== Motorcycle license plates ==
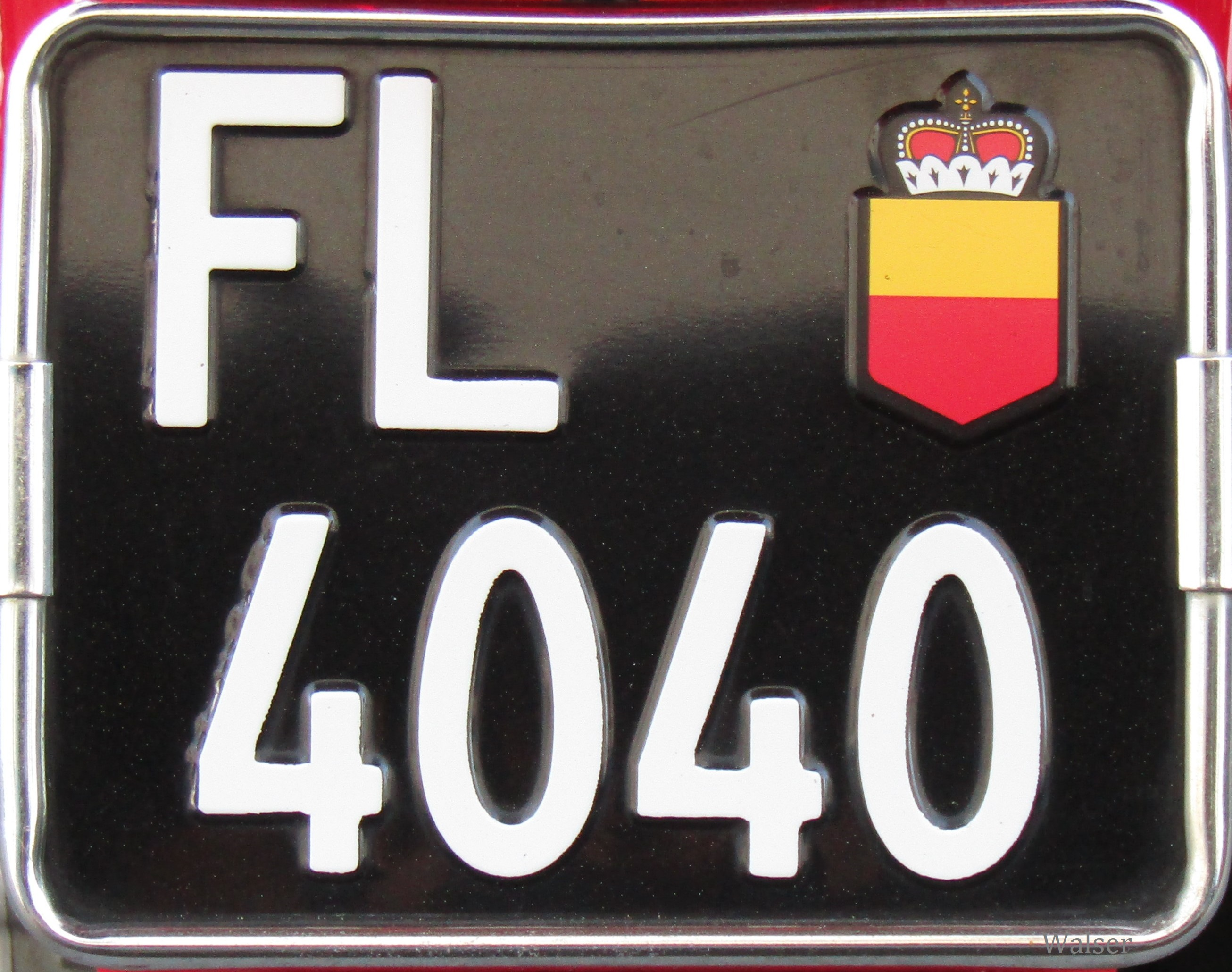
Motorcycle license plate

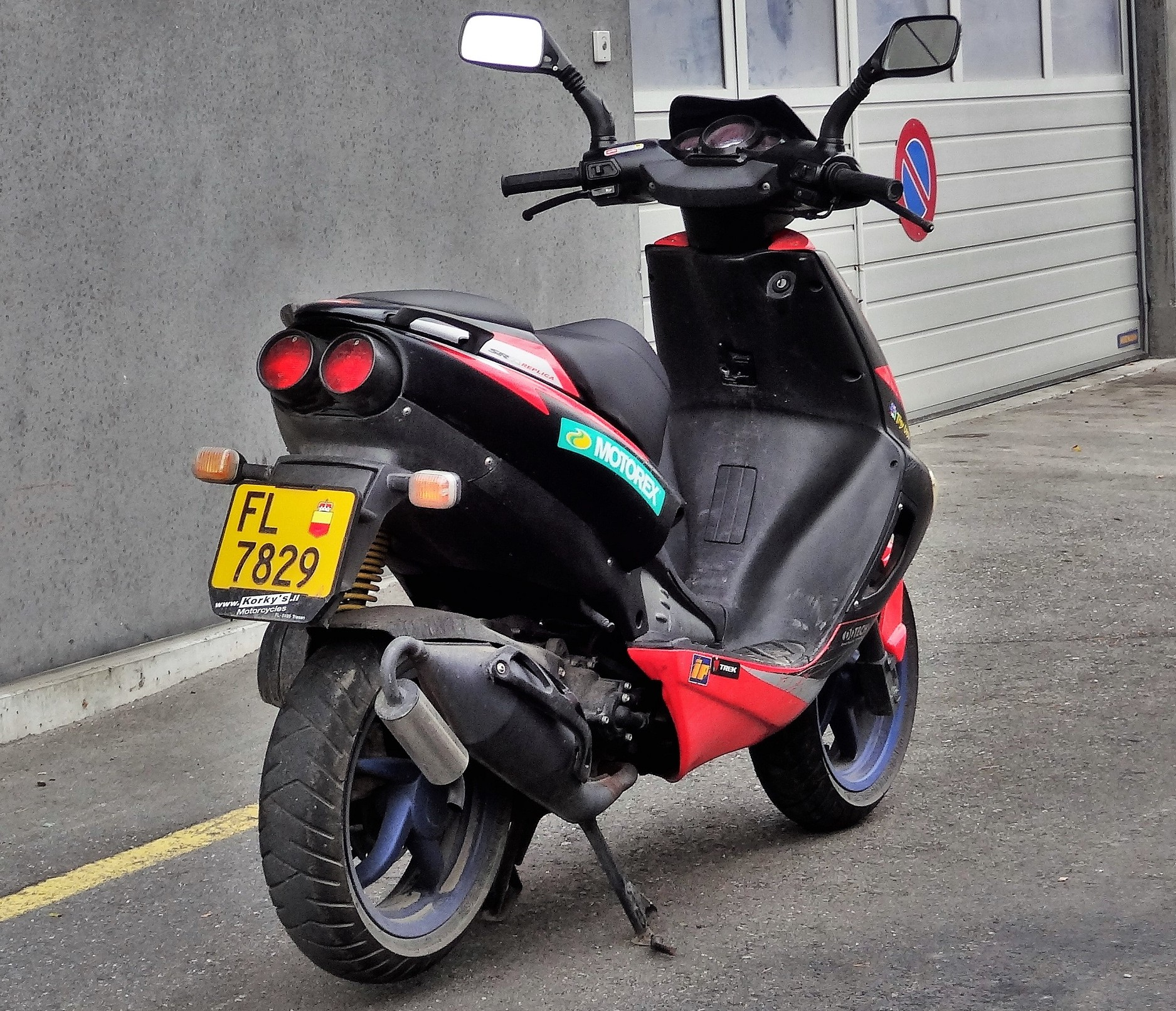
Yellow license plate

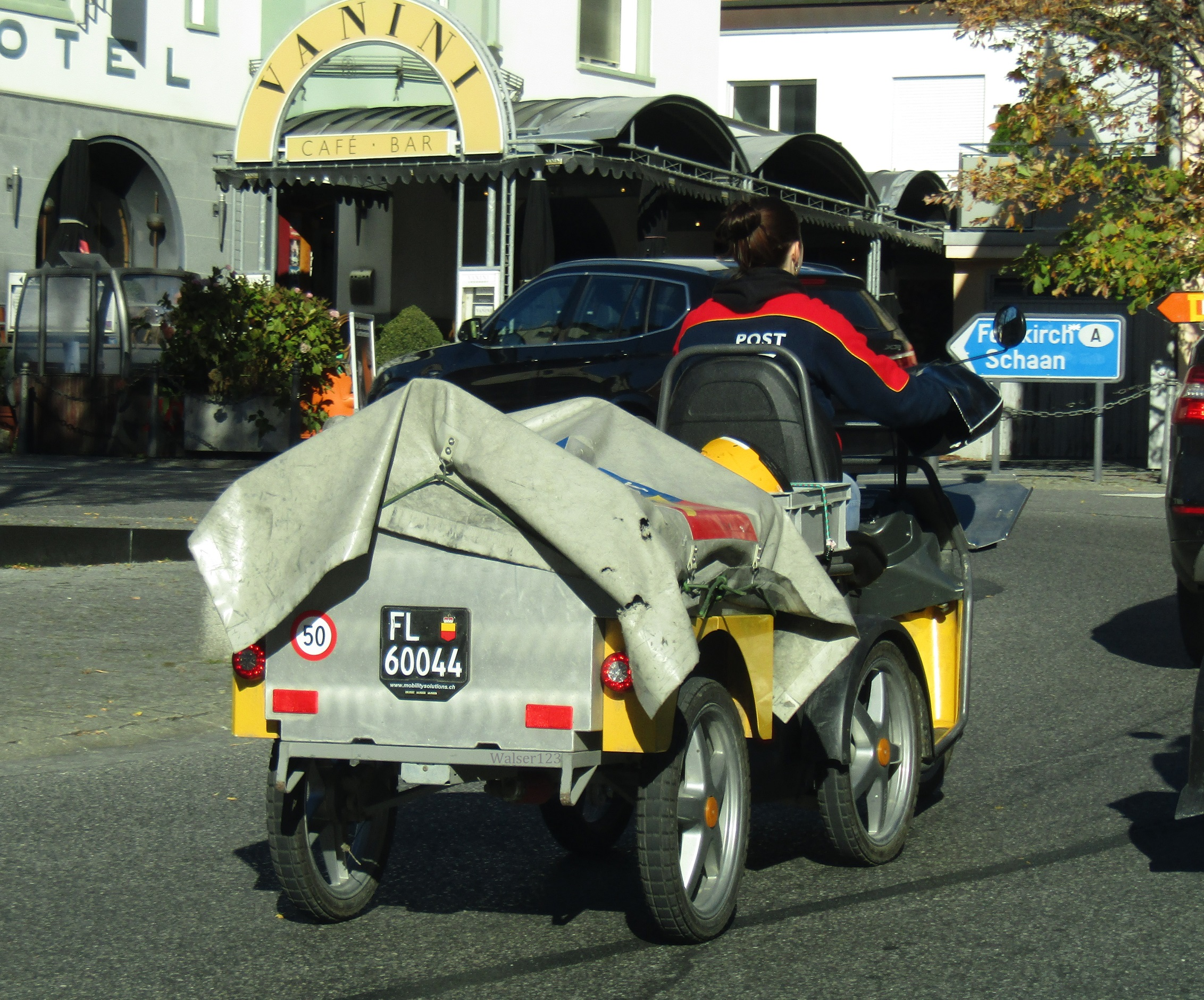
Motorcycle trailer

Motorcycle license plates are 18 cm wide and 14 cm high. License plates for motorcycles, scooters, trikes, quads, light electric vehicles, and motorcycle trailers, as well as dealer plates and temporary plates, have a black background with white lettering. Short-term motorcycle plates have yellow lettering. Numbers are assigned sequentially in ascending order. Returned motorcycle license plates are reissued after at least one year or auctioned online. In December 2025, the highest motorcycle license plate numbers were in the FL 6700 range.

As of June 30, 2025, a total of 5,044 vehicles were registered in the motorcycle category. With 4,645 vehicles, conventional motorcycles constitute the largest segment in this group. Of these, 3,137 were standard motorcycles and 1,508 were scooters.

Yellow license plates with black lettering are issued to small motorcycles, and electric vehicles with an engine capacity of less than 125 cubic centimeters and a maximum speed of 45 km/h, as well as temporary motorcycle license plates. The assigned number range for these plates is FL 7000 to FL 7999.

The numbering of yellow motorcycle license plates is not sequential, but rather based on availability. Although relatively few vehicles are registered in this category, yellow plates with numbers from all parts of the allocated number range exist. As of June 30, 2025, approximately 400 vehicles were registered in this category.

Example	Numbers		Categories
Example	from	to	Categories
Standard Liechtenstein motorcycle registration plate	21 →		Motorcycles, Scooters, Quad bikes, Neighborhood Electric Vehicles etc.
Yellow motorcycle license plates are used for small motorcycles and electric vehicles with an engine capacity of less than 125 cubic centimeters and a maximum speed of 45 km/h, yellow motorcycle license plates are numbered between 7000 and 7999	7000	7999	Light motorcycles, Electric vehicles
Liechtenstein registration plate for motorcycle trailers, with numbers above 60000	60001 →		Motorcycle trailers
Liechtenstein dealer license plate for motorcycles, the number range starts with 501	501 U →		Dealer license plates
Temporary motorcycle license plate of Liechtenstein, with numbers above 1800	1801 →		Temporary license plates
Liechtenstein short-term motorcycle license plate, with numbers above 50000	50101 →		Short-term license plates

=== Moped and E-Bike license plates ===
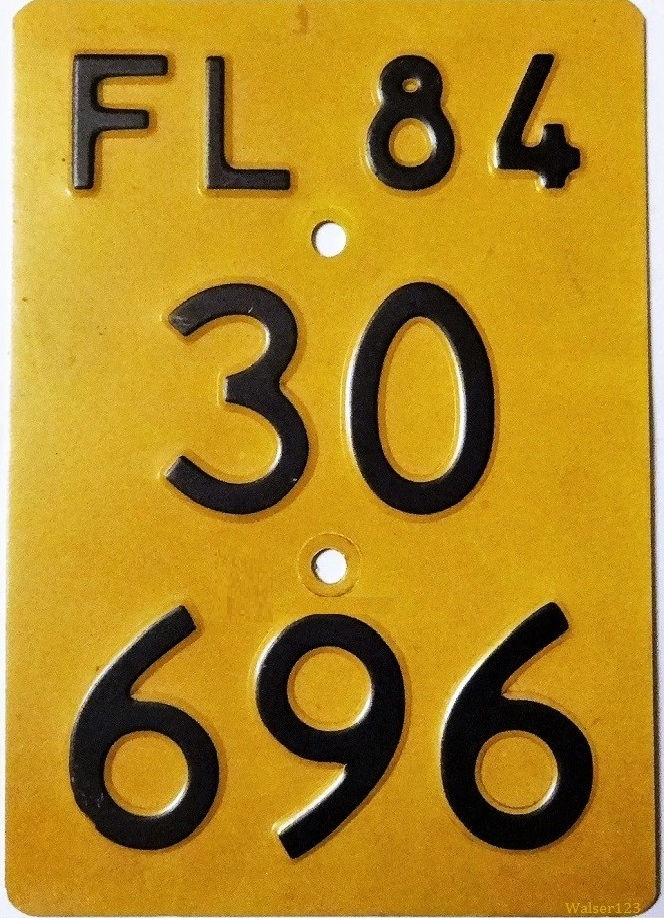
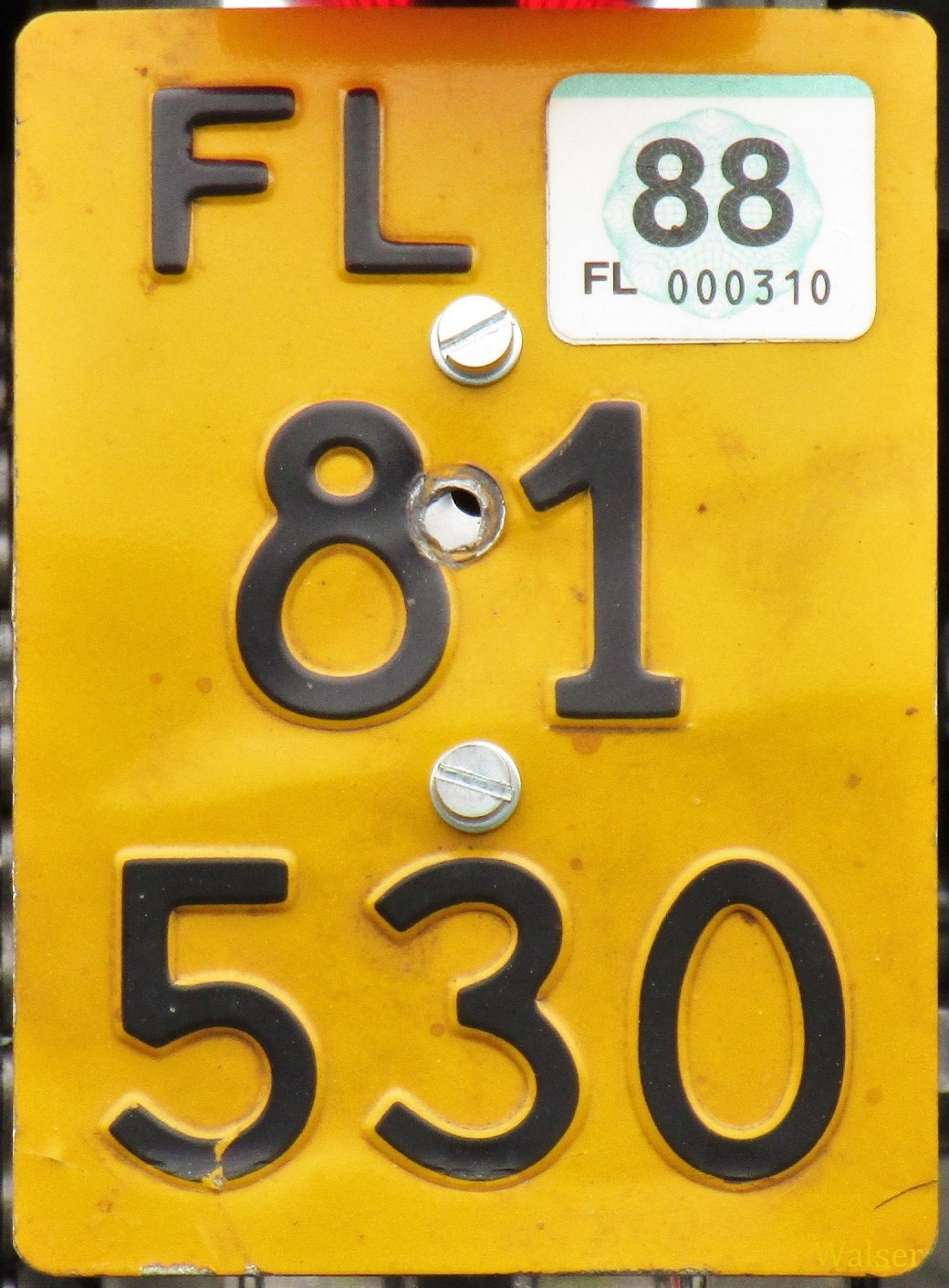
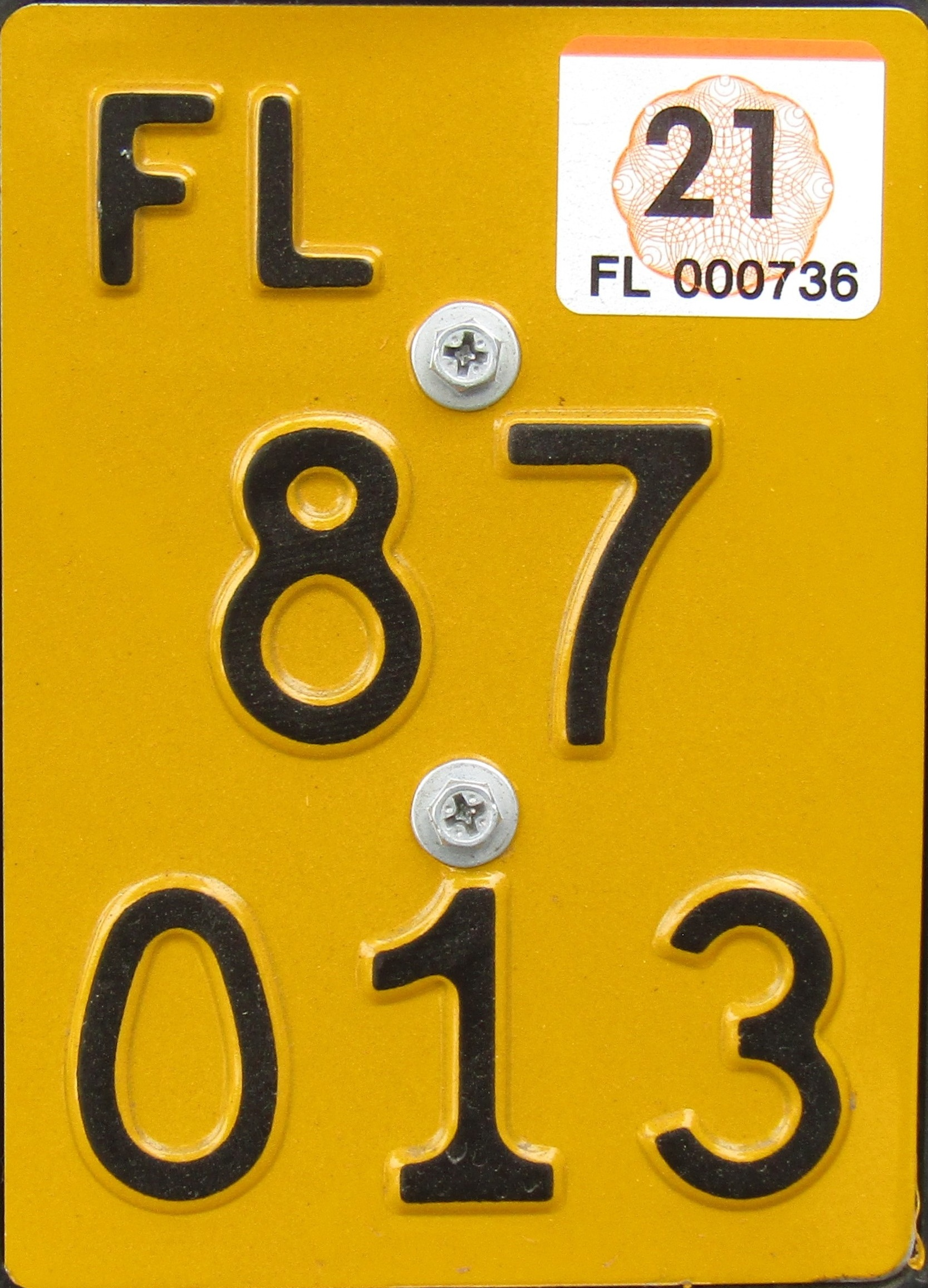

The license plates for mopeds and e-bikes are 10 cm wide and 14 cm high. They have a reflective dark yellow background with black lettering and do not bear a coat of arms. Until 1985, these plates were issued annually and displayed the current two-digit year in the upper right corner, next to the letters FL.

From 1985 onwards, the two-digit year label was omitted from the license plates, and they have not been replaced annually since then. Instead, an insurance sticker with the current year must be affixed as proof of insurance. This sticker is valid from January 1st of the printed year of issue until May 31st of the following year. At the same time, the numbering was stopped at FL 31xxx and restarted at FL 80000. Currently, the highest numbers on moped license plates are in the FL 88200 range (as of December 2025).

== Registering a vehicle ==
License plates are assigned by the National Road Office in Vaduz when a vehicle is registered. The numbers are generally assigned sequentially, in ascending order. Occasionally, lower numbers that have been returned are put back into circulation. License plates, with the exception of temporary plates and customs plates, remain the property of the state and must be returned after the vehicle is deregistered. If license plates are stolen or lost, they are reported to the national police's search system. The plates and their corresponding numbers are then blocked from being issued for 15 years.

A standard license plate costs CHF 25, two standard plates cost CHF 40. Since January 2019, license plates with a matte black base color (black paint without gloss, which absorbs light instead of reflecting it) have also been issued upon request. A single matte black license plate for motorcycles costs CHF 130, two matte black license plates for cars cost CHF 250. The rear license plates can be ordered in either long or high format.

License plates are assigned to the vehicle owner, not the vehicle itself. If the owner changes vehicles, the same license plate can be affixed to the new vehicle after registration. This also makes it possible to purchase a new vehicle and drive it immediately with the owner's existing license plates (provided the insurance company has been notified by phone beforehand). The vehicle registration documents for both the new and old vehicles can then be sent by mail to the road traffic office, and the owner will receive the new documents by mail within a few days. During the transition period, the new vehicle may be driven without official documents; however, a special document (available free of charge online) must be carried and presented during any police checks. This procedure is only permitted in Switzerland and Liechtenstein. Driving in other countries is not recommended until the vehicle has the necessary documents.

The license plates must be affixed to the vehicle as vertically as possible (maximum upward tilt of 30 degrees, maximum downward tilt of 15 degrees). They must be located at a height between 0.20 m (lower edge) and 1.50 m (upper edge). The rear license plate must be legible along the longitudinal axis of the vehicle and within an angle of 30 degrees on either side of it.

=== License Plate Auctions ===
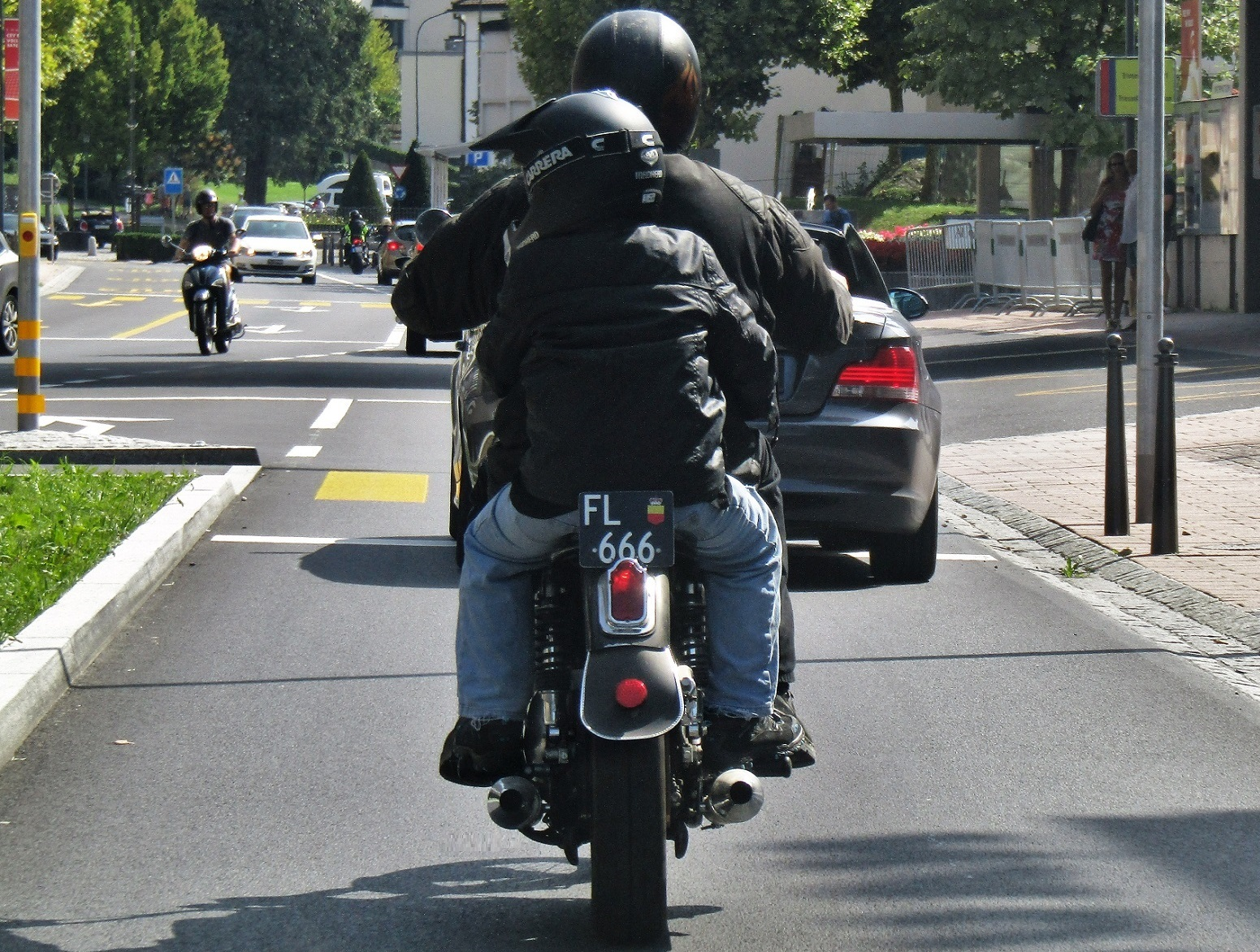
FL 666

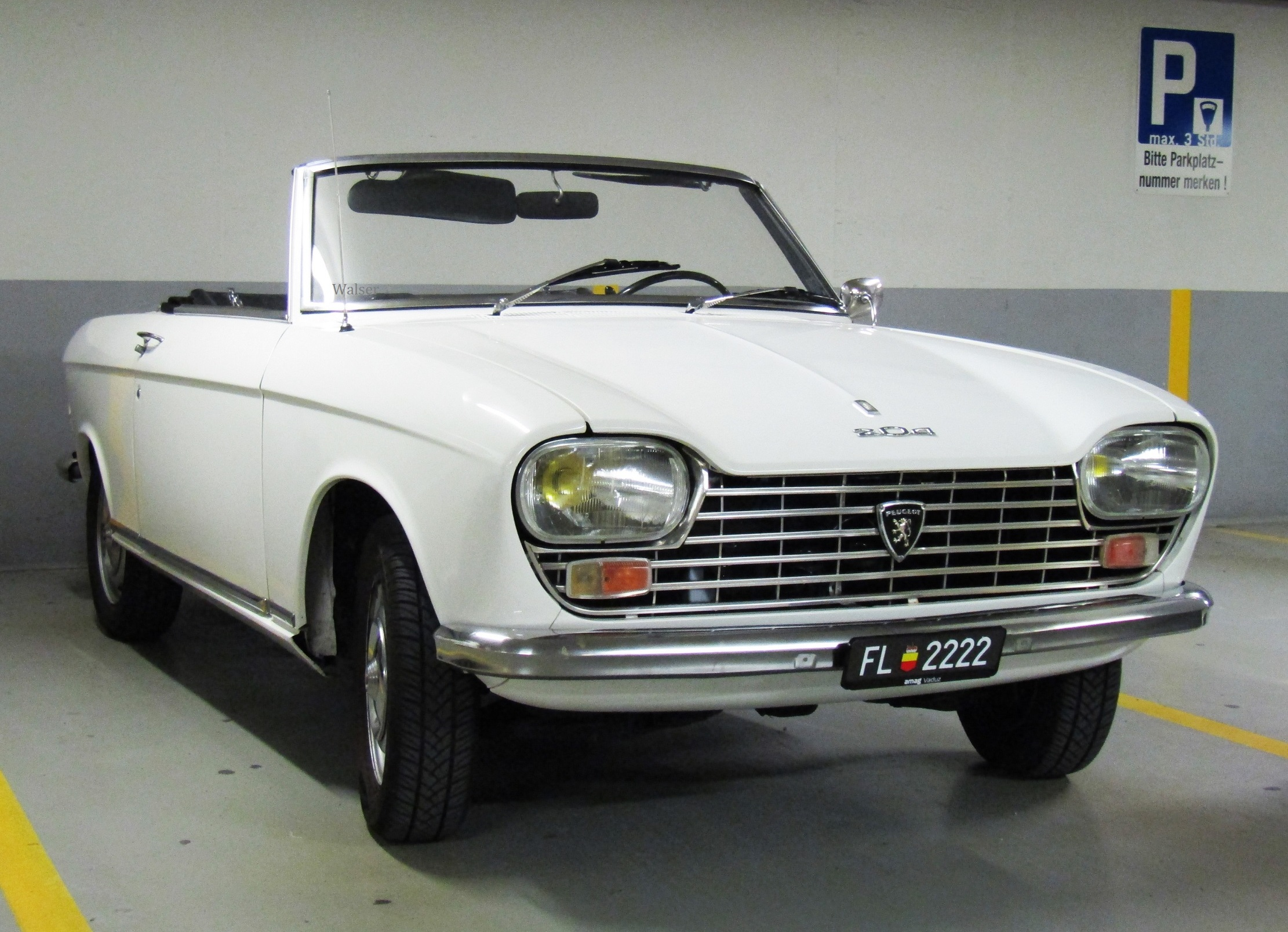
FL 2222

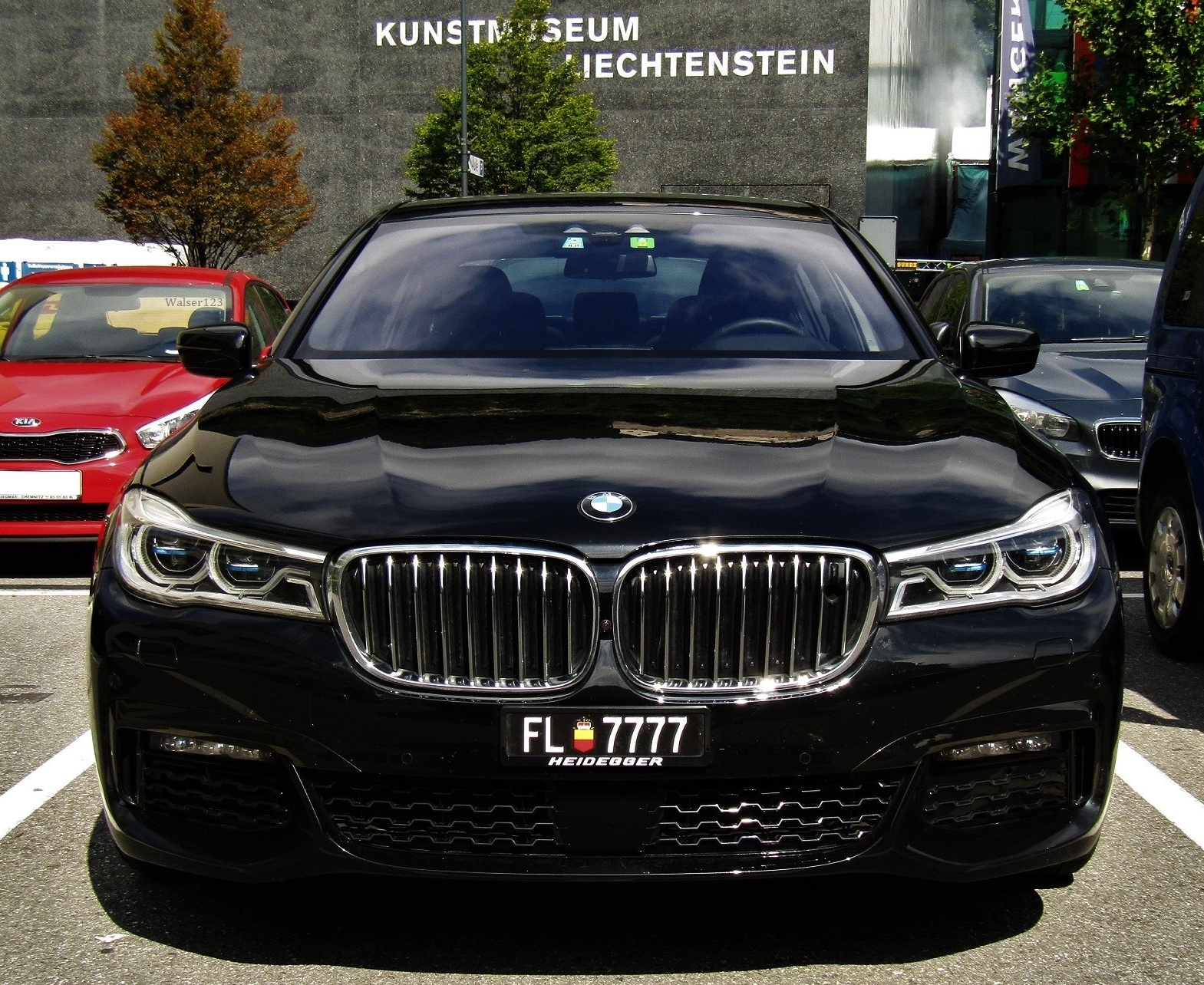
FL 7777

The following types of license plates are issued by auction to the highest bidder:

- License plates with low numbers (four-digit car plates or two-digit motorcycle plates)
- License plates with conspicuous number combinations

Since August 2025, license plates can be purchased via online auctions. Previously, license plates with low numbers or conspicuous number combinations were auctioned off every two years at the inspection hall of the National Road Office in Vaduz. The auctions were public and accessible to everyone. This led to information privacy concerns. Against this background, the Ministry of Transport commissioned the National Road Office to develop a modern and data protection-compliant solution. In the future, the auctions will be held online over a period of two to three weeks. Four to five auctions per year are planned, each with around five license plates for motor vehicles, as well as additional motorcycle plates to coincide with the start of the season in spring. Only license plates for personal use may be bid on. Payment for a purchased plate can be made by invoice or directly at the counter upon collection.

All natural persons of legal age residing in Liechtenstein are eligible to participate. Legal entities must be registered in the Liechtenstein Commercial Register and represented by a natural person authorized to act on behalf of the legal entity, as evidenced by the extract from the Commercial Register. Participation requires registration. After a successful bid, the license plate number is immediately released for registration at the National Road Office in Vaduz. A vehicle must be registered to the auctioned license plate within three months of the auction date. Otherwise, the right to registration expires. If the auctioned license plates are stolen or lost, they will be reported to the National Police's search system. The plates will be blocked from being issued for 15 years and can then be reassigned to the person who won them at auction.

=== License Plate Reservation ===
It is possible to reserve desired number combinations at the National Road Office in Vaduz. A prerequisite is that the desired number combination does not fall under the provisions of section 4 of the license plate regulations, such as four-digit car plates, two-digit motorcycle plates, or conspicuous number combinations like FL 666, FL 20202, or FL 40000. These plates are only available through omline license plate auctions hosted by the National Road Office in Vaduz. A further requirement is that the number has not already been assigned to another owner.

In addition, license plates with lower numbers can be purchased directly at a fixed price. These are available on the online e-auction platform and can be purchased by registered users. The fee for a personalized license plate number is CHF 500 according to the Fee Ordinance and is invoiced upon ordering. Before registration with the desired license plate number, it must be paid for. License plate reservations are only possible within the currently used number range, which currently ranges from FL 2000 to approximately FL 42800 for car license plates and from FL 21 to approximately FL 6700 for motorcycle license plates (as of January 2026).

If the owner does not register a new vehicle, the license plates must be returned to the National Road Office. The registration number remains reserved for the previous owner for one year. The reservation can be extended for another year for a fee of CHF 50. Many vehicle owners in Liechtenstein keep their license plate number for life or pass it on to their descendants within the family.

=== Interchangeable license plates ===
It is possible to register two vehicles under one license plate. However, only one vehicle may be in operation at any given time. For veteran vehicles whose initial registration was at least 30 years ago and which correspond to the original design, it is possible to register more than two vehicles under one interchangeable license plate. This applies, however, only if exclusively veteran vehicles are registered under that license plate. For vehicles with interchangeable license plates, the tax is levied on the vehicle with the highest tax rate. All additional vehicles are subject to an annual interchangeable license plate fee of CHF 114, but not exceeding the amount of the first tax payment.

== Deregistering a vehicle ==
When deregistering a vehicle, the owner must return the license plates to the National Road Office. The only exception to this rule is temporary license plates, which do not necessarily have to be returned after their validity period, but will be officially confiscated if misused.

=== License Plate Cancellation ===
When a vehicle registration is cancelled or the license plates are returned permanently, the vehicle registration document is cancelled and the license plates are destroyed. Taxes are automatically refunded upon return of the plates. The insurance company is also notified accordingly. The license plate number will be reissued after at least one year. The numbers of stolen or lost license plates are blocked for 15 years and entered into the search system.

=== Vehicle Registration Cancellation and License Plate Deposit ===
If the registered owner is only temporarily deregistering their vehicle, they can deposit or reserve the license plates for a fee. The vehicle registration document is cancelled, and the license plates can be deposited for up to one year. The deposit fee is CHF 50, or CHF 30 for motorcycles and trailers. Taxes are automatically refunded upon return of the plates. The insurance company is also notified accordingly.

=== License Plate Deposit ===
If the owner does not use their vehicle for a certain period of time, they can deposit the license plates to stop paying taxes and insurance. The deposit fee is CHF 50, or CHF 30 for motorcycles and trailers. Taxes are automatically refunded upon return of the plates. A corresponding notification is also sent to the insurance company. The fees are governed by the Fee Ordinance.

If the deposit is to be extended, the owner must contact the National Road Office themselves. The fees for extending the deposit period are also regulated in the Fee Ordinance. If the license plates are not extended or re-registered after the deposit period expires, the owner forfeits their right to re-register them in their name.

=== Transfer of license plates ===
A change of ownership or the transfer of license plates to another person is only possible in the following cases:

- Between natural persons up to the third degree of kinship.
- Between partners in a registered partnership.
- Between cohabiting partners who have demonstrably lived in the same household for at least three years.
- In the case of divorce, the ownership history is taken into account. If a connection between the requesting person and the license plate is established, a change of ownership can be carried out with the consent of both parties within a maximum of one year after the divorce proceedings.
- Between a legal entity and a natural person. The connection between the natural person and the legal entity must be demonstrated with an extract from the commercial register.

== Former and planned license plate types ==
=== Rental vehicle license plates ===
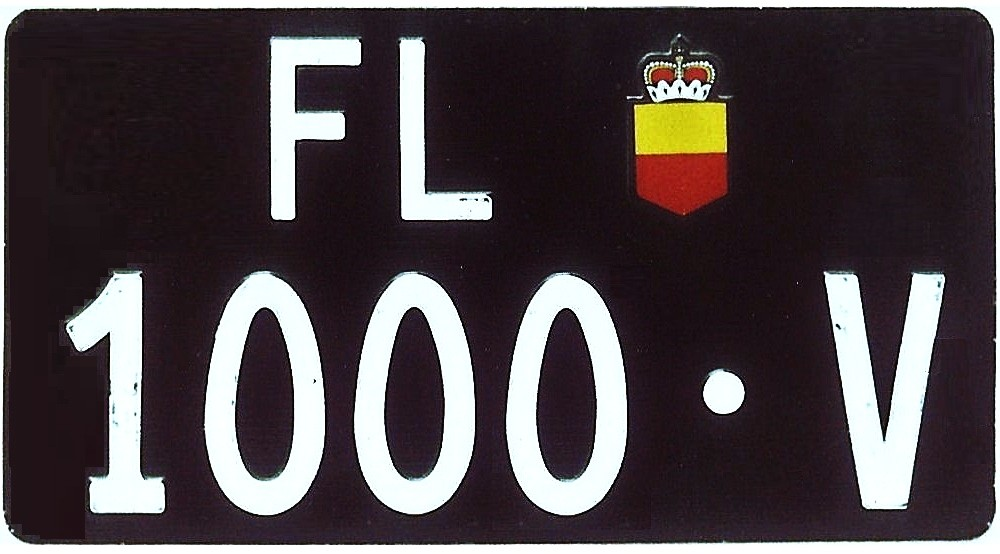
Former rental car license plate, issued between 1977 and 2001.

Between 1977 and 2001, special license plates with the additional letter "V" for rental (German: Vermietung) to the right of the number were issued for rental vehicles registered in Liechtenstein, similar to the regulations in Switzerland. The number range of rental vehicle license plates began at FL 1000 V, and there were special license plates for motorcycles with numbers starting at FL 7000 V. Since 2001, standard license plates with regular numbers have been used again for Liechtenstein rental vehicles, as was the case before 1977.

=== Collective license plates ===
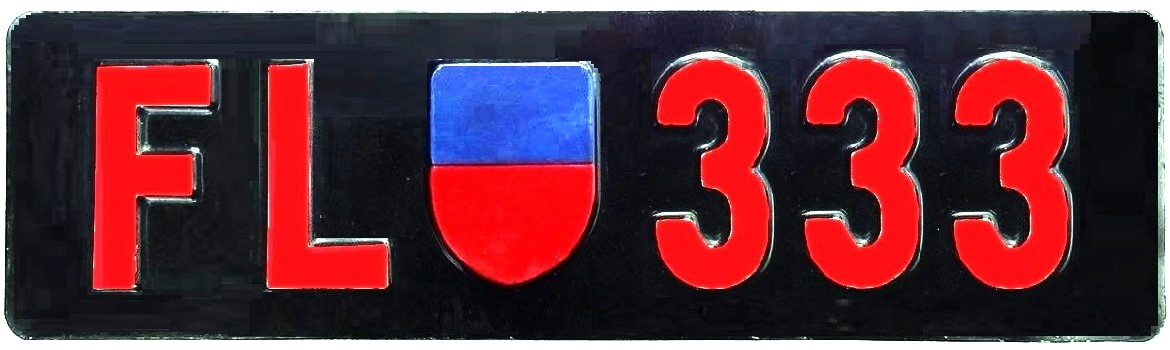
Former Liechtenstein "collective license plate" (dealer license plate), valid from 1933 to 1977.

From 1933 to 1977, Liechtenstein, like Switzerland, issued so-called collective license plates or experimental license plates for the motor vehicle trade. Collective license plates had the standard format, with numbers from the regular series and a black background, but, as in Switzerland, they were inscribed with red letters and numbers and without the additional letter "U". These collective license plates could be used by the motor vehicle trade, with a collective vehicle registration document, for test drives, etc. Collective plates were replaced from 1977 onwards, as in Switzerland, by the current dealer plates.

=== Diplomatic license plates ===
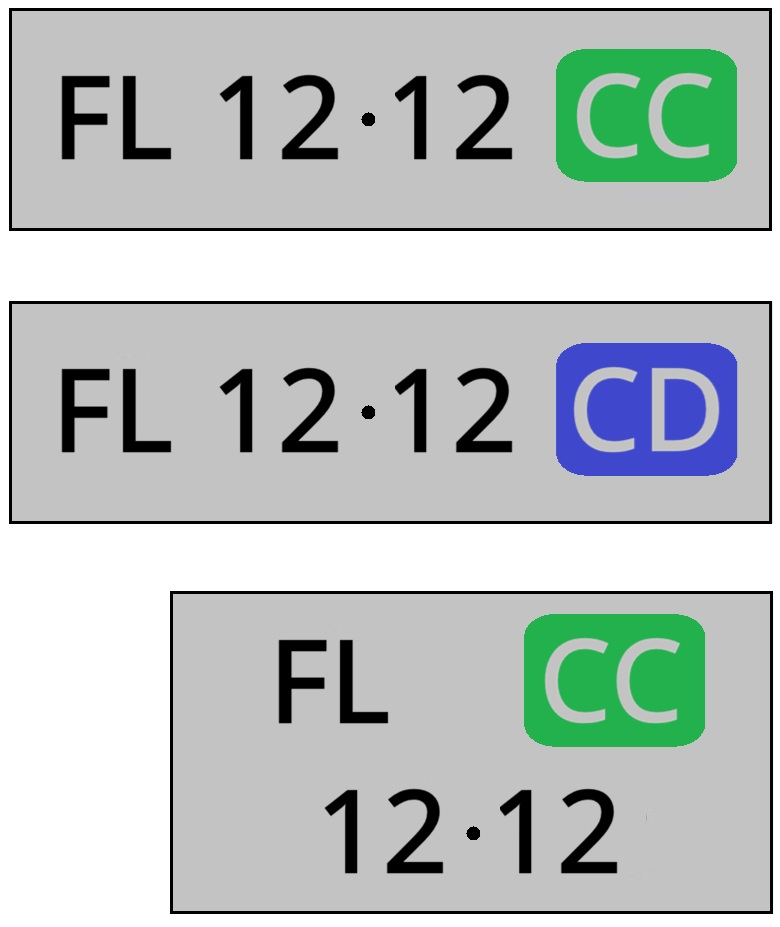
Diplomatic license plates of Liechtenstein (1981), planned design. These license plates have not been implemented to this day.

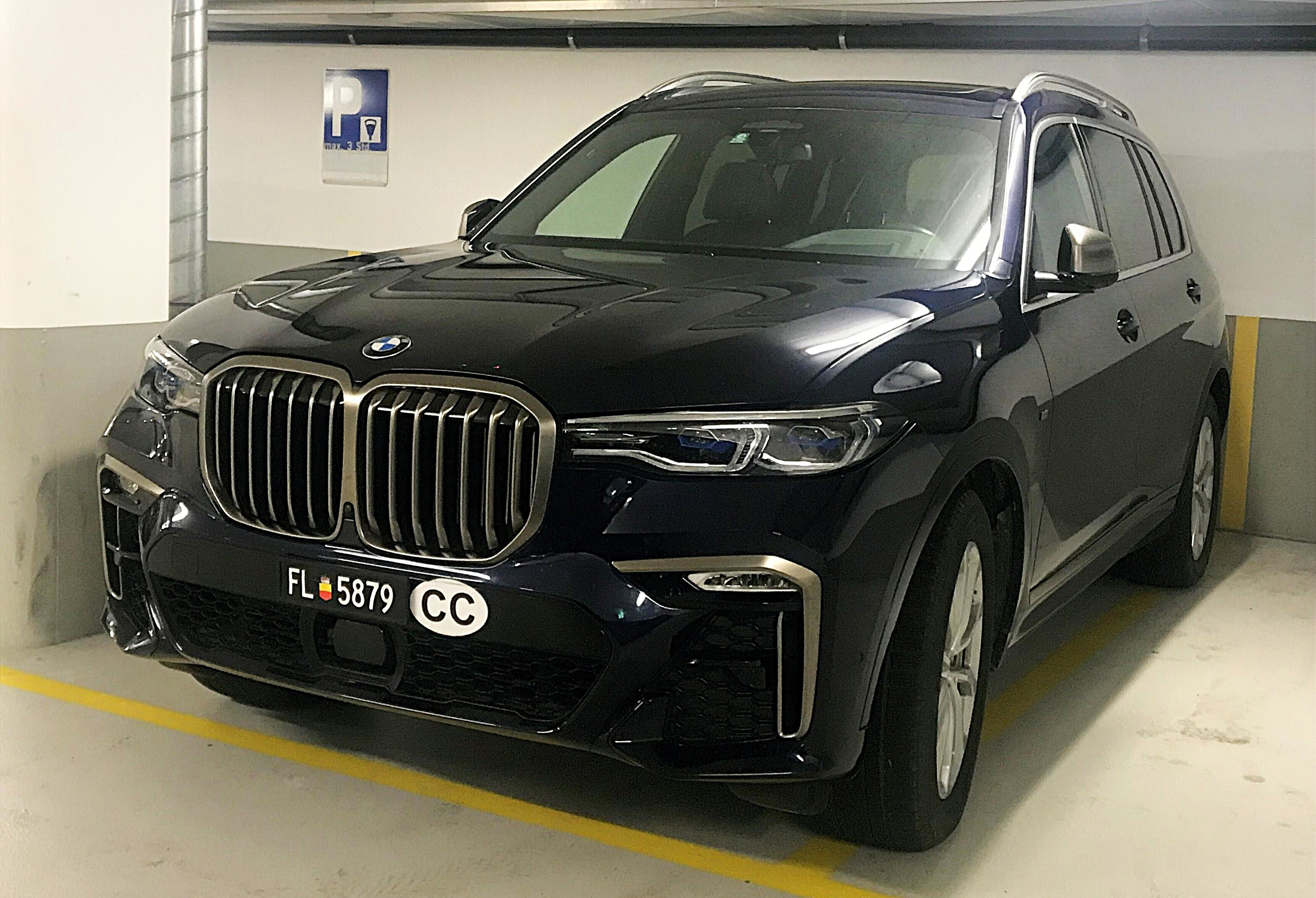
Car with a Corps Consulaire sticker.

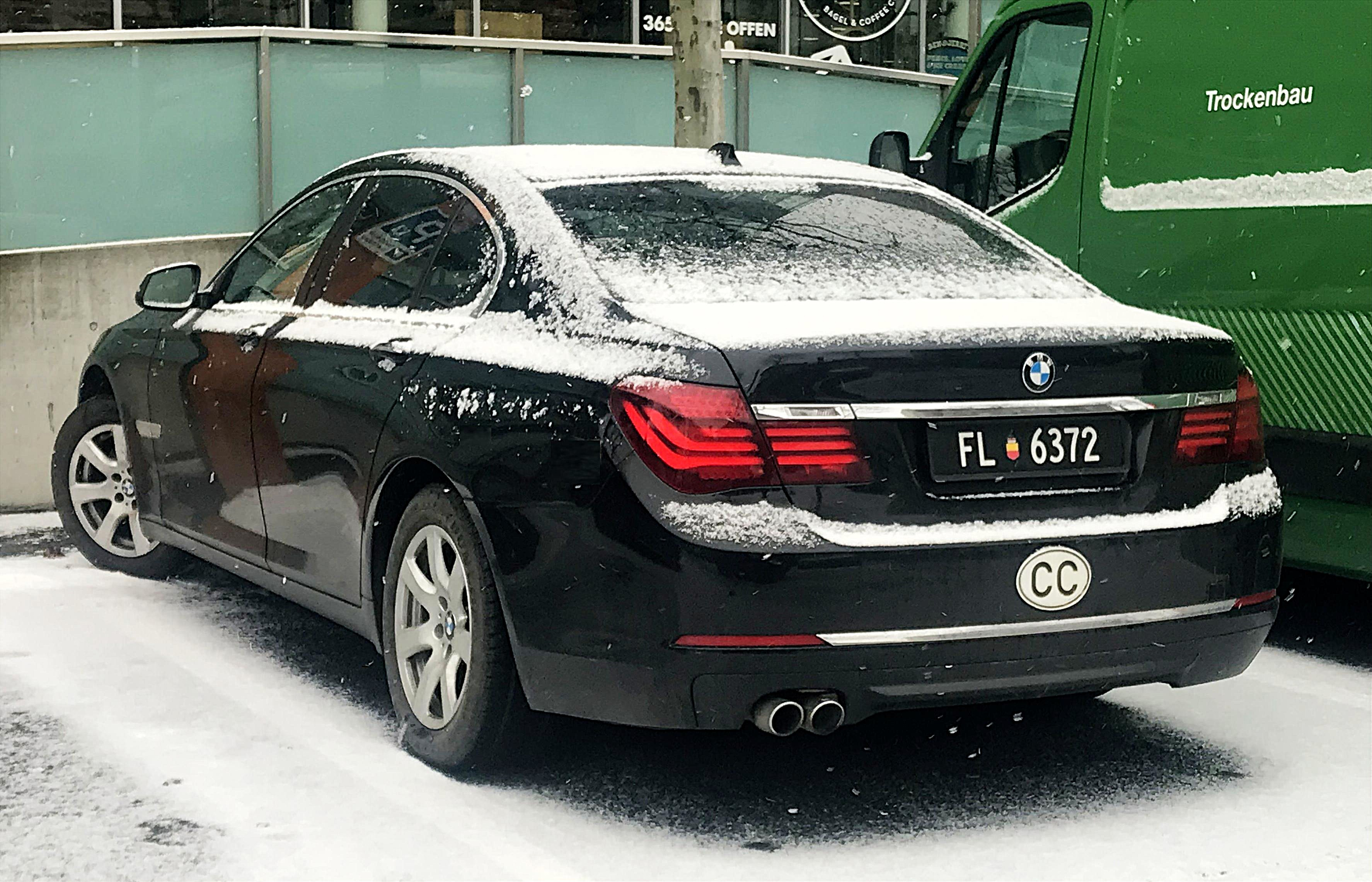
Car with a Corps Consulaire sticker.

A 1981 decree of the government of Liechtenstein provided for special license plates for vehicles belonging to owners with diplomatic or consular privileges and immunities. These license plates were to be made of bare aluminum. They were to have the silver base color of aluminum and black lettering. From left to right, the license plate was to display the country code FL, the assigned numbers, and then the symbol "CD" (French: Corps Diplomatique) or "CC" (French: Corps Consulaire), in the base color of the plate (silver) on a dark green or dark blue background. The front license plate was to be 38 cm long and 11 cm high, the rear plate 30 cm long and 16 cm high. The symbols and letters should not be embossed on a 1.5 mm raised surface, as is the case with all other license plates, but should be indelibly etched into the metal using a photographic process.

The regulation of 1981 has not been implemented to this day. Diplomatic license plates have never been issued in Liechtenstein. Motor vehicles belonging to owners with diplomatic or consular privileges and immunities receive regular black license plates. In addition to these plates, an oval plate or sticker marked "CD" or "CC" can be affixed to the vehicle if desired. As of the end of 2024, the Principality of Liechtenstein maintained diplomatic relations with 136 states. Of these 136 states, 85 are accredited to Liechtenstein with a non-resident ambassador. They are responsible for Liechtenstein from their embassies in Bern (Switzerland) or Vienna (Austria). Furthermore, there were 45 consular missions in Liechtenstein. Swiss diplomatic license plates are not uncommon on Liechtenstein's roads. Domestic vehicles displaying an oval "CC" or "CD" sticker, however, are very rare. The introduction of diplomatic license plates in Liechtenstein will probably be a long time coming.

=== International vehicle registration code ===
International vehicle registration code of Liechtenstein, the oval, white FL sticker no longer needs to be displayed.

The country in which a motor vehicle's vehicle registration plate was issued may be indicated by an international vehicle registration code. It is legally part of the official national vehicle registration plate.

Since Liechtenstein's accession to the international road traffic conventions of Geneva and Vienna in 2020 and 2021, the oval, white FL sticker on the rear of vehicles, no longer needs to be displayed. Liechtenstein ratified the 1968 Vienna Convention on Road Traffic on March 2, 2021 and the 1949 Geneva Convention on International Road Traffic on April 1, 2020.

Although the sticker is no longer strictly necessary according to the agreement, its affixing is still recommended. It is expected that it will take several years before Liechtenstein's accession to the Geneva and Vienna International Conventions on Road Traffic is fully acknowledged by the authorities of neighboring countries.

Accession to the Geneva and Vienna Conventions on Road Traffic is also important for Liechtenstein because it provides greater legal certainty, particularly abroad. This legal certainty was previously lacking or not present to this extent, leading to recurring problems with Liechtenstein driver's licenses and their recognition abroad. With the simultaneous accession to the Geneva and Vienna Conventions on Road Traffic, the Liechtenstein driver's license is now recognized in approximately 150 countries worldwide.

== Souvenir license plates ==
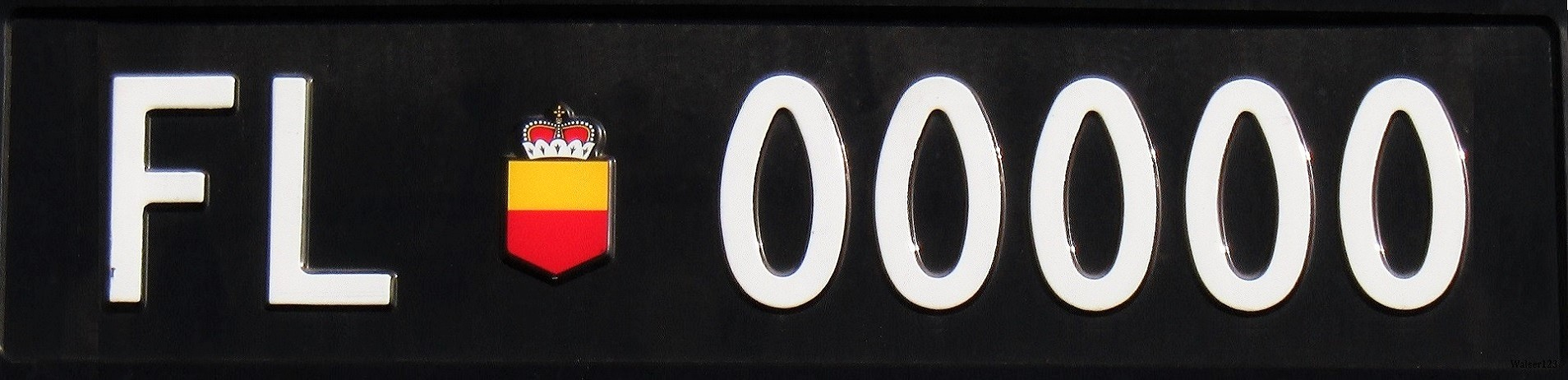
Genuine Liechtenstein vehicle registration plate with the invalid number 00000.

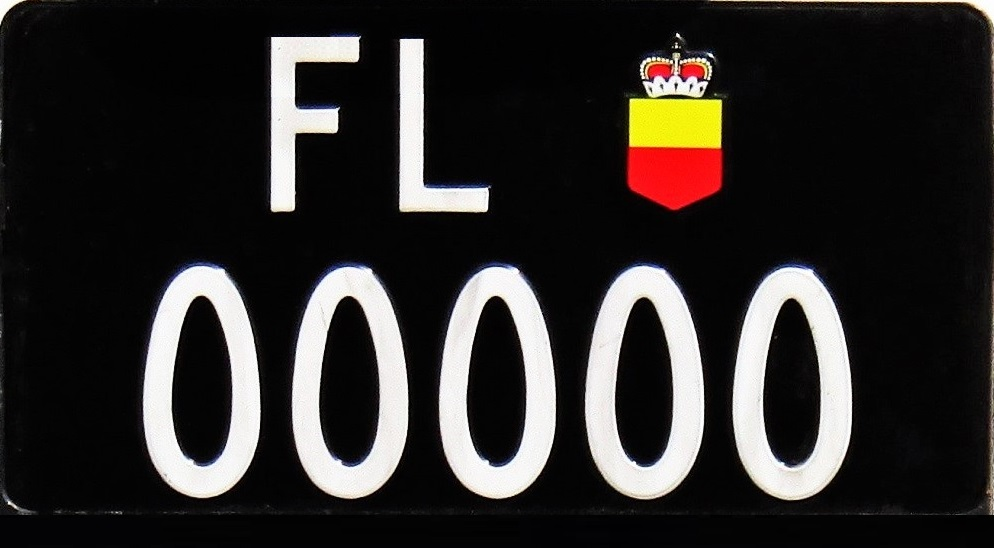
Genuine Liechtenstein vehicle registration plate with the invalid number 00000.

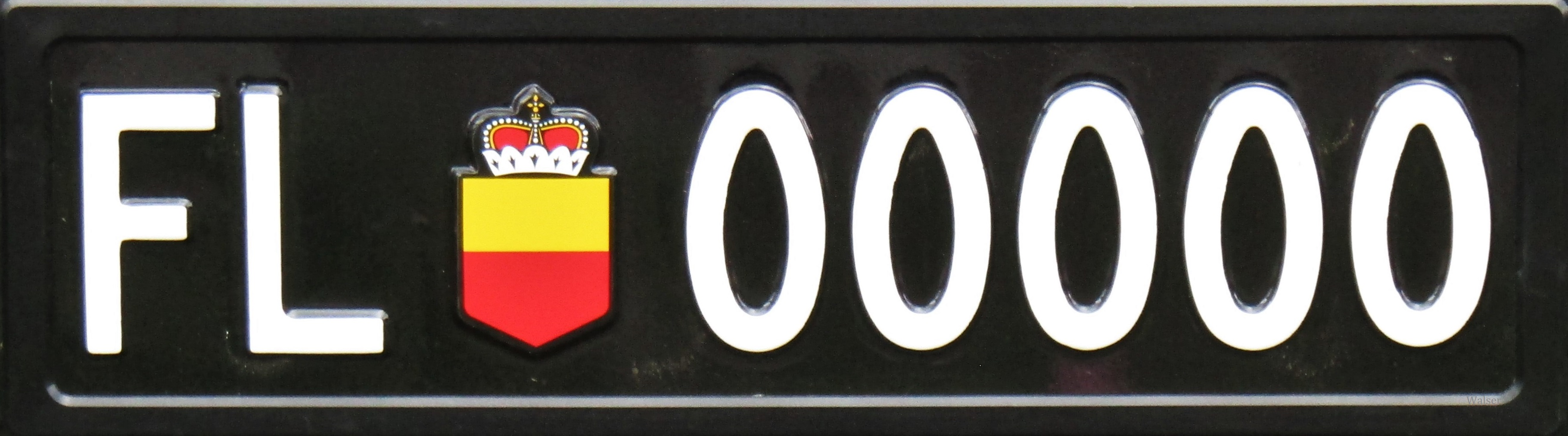
Genuine Liechtenstein vehicle registration plate with the invalid number 00000.

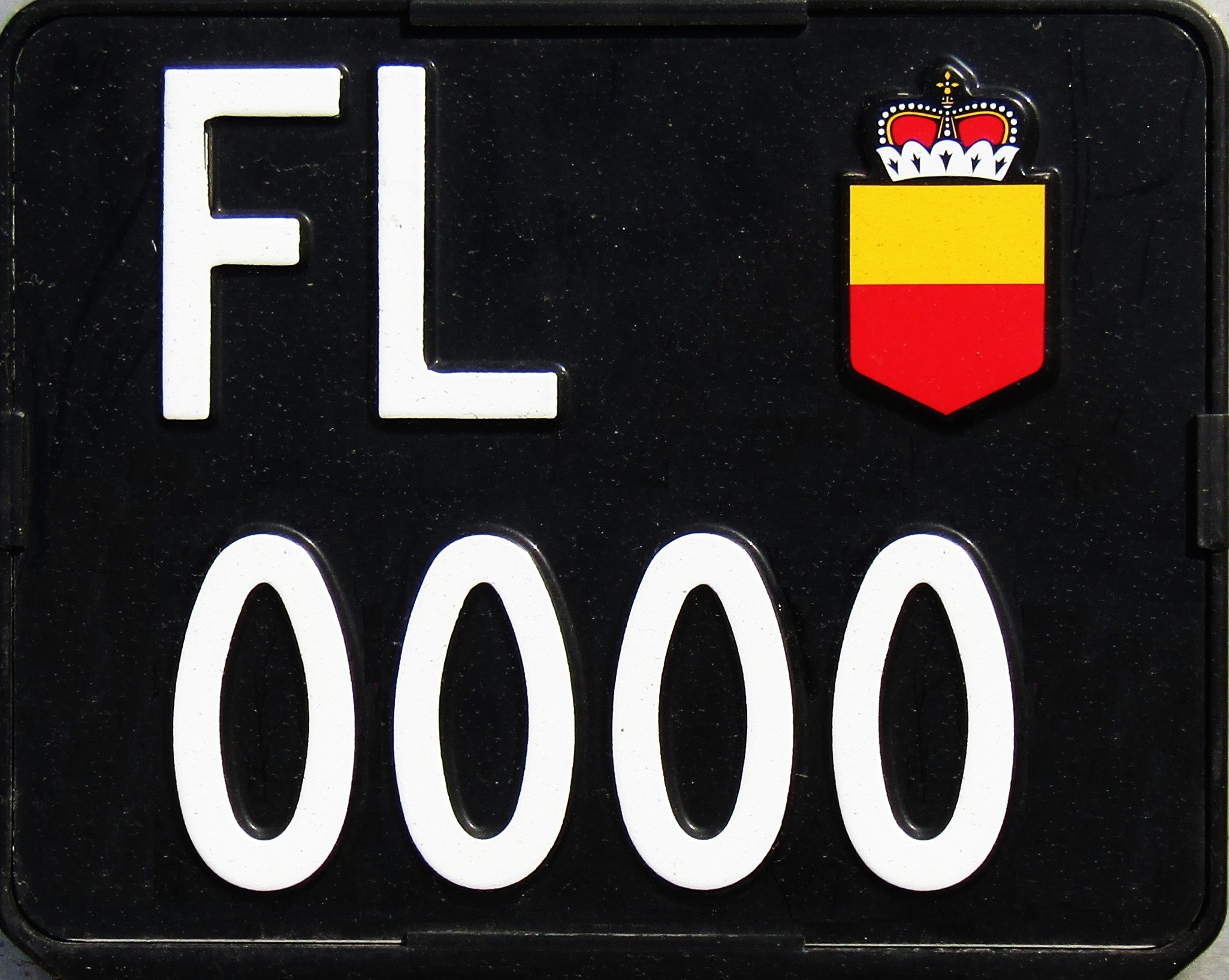
Genuine Liechtenstein motorcycle registration plate with the invalid number 0000.

Souvenir license plates are genuine license plates, each bearing the invalid number FL 00000. The material, colors, and dimensions of these plates are identical to regular license plates. Souvenir plates are available at the counter of the National Road Office in Vaduz. The price for one plate is CHF 25, and a pair of plates costs CHF 40.

Souvenir license plates are available in the following formats:

- 500 × 110 mm – Long rear license plate
- 300 × 160 mm – Square rear license plate
- 300 × 80 mm – Standard front license plate
- 180 × 140 mm – Standard motorcycle license plate
