= Vehicle registration plates of Saint Vincent and the Grenadines =

Saint Vincent and the Grenadines
- Country: Saint Vincent and the Grenadines
- Country code: WV

Current series
- Slogan: None
- Size: 110 mm × 520 mm 4.3 in × 20.5 in
- Serial format: A1234

Saint Vincent and the Grenadines requires its residents to register their motor vehicles and display vehicle registration plates. Current plates are European standard 520 mm × 110 mm (20.5 in × 4.3 in). Plates are white or silver on black, or black on reflective white (front) and black on reflective yellow (rear).

Image	First issued	Design	Serial format	Serials issued	Notes
		White on black	A 1234		
