= Vehicle registration plates of French Polynesia =

French Polynesia
- Current regular legal standard number plate from French Polynesia (987), France.
- Country: French Polynesia (France)
- Country code: F

Current series
- Size: 520 mm × 110 mm 20.5 in × 4.3 in
- Serial format: Not standard
- Colour (front): Black on yellow
- Colour (rear): Black on white

French Polynesia requires its residents to register their motor vehicles and display vehicle registration plates. Current plates are European standard 520 mm × 110 mm (20.5 in × 4.3 in), and use French stamping dies. The overseas departments and territories of France have three-digit codes, starting with 97, which was originally the single code for them all.

Image	First issued	Design	Serial format	Serials issued	Notes
	1993	Black on yellow	123456 P		
