= Vehicle registration plates of the Comoros =

Republic of the Union of the Comoros
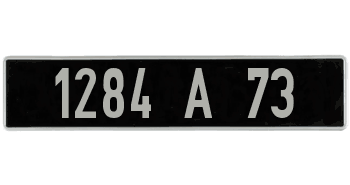
- Country: Comoros
- Country code: None (KM is used unofficially on certain plates)

Current series
- Slogan: None
- Size: 520 mm × 110 mm 20.5 in × 4.3 in
- Serial format: 1234 A 56
- Colour (front): White on black
- Colour (rear): White on black

The Comoros requires its residents to register their motor vehicles and display vehicle registration plates. The current plates are European standard 520 mm × 110 mm, and use French stamping dies.

Image	First issued	Design	Slogan	Serial format	Serials issued	Notes
