= Vehicle registration plates of Wallis and Futuna =

Wallis & Futuna
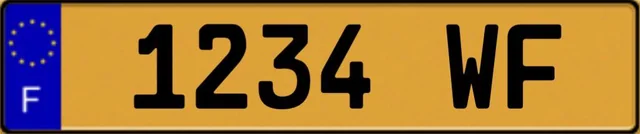
- Current regular legal standard number plate from New Caledonia (988), France.
- Country: Wallis and Futuna (France)
- Country code: F

Current series
- Size: 520 mm × 110 mm 20.5 in × 4.3 in
- Serial format: 1234 WF
- Colour (front): Black on white
- Colour (rear): Black on yellow

Wallis and Futuna requires its residents to register their motor vehicles and display vehicle registration plates. Current plates are European standard 520 mm × 110 mm (20.5 in × 4.3 in), and use French stamping dies. The overseas departments and territories of France have three-digit codes, starting with 97, which was originally the single code for them all.

Image	First issued	Design	Serial format	Serials issued	Notes
	1987	White on black	1234 WF		
		White on black	WF 1234		
