= Vehicle registration plates of Mayotte =

Mayotte requires its residents to register their motor vehicles and display vehicle registration plates. Current plates are European standard 520 mm × 110 mm, and use French stamping dies. The overseas departments and territories of France have three-digit codes, starting with 97, which was originally the single code for them all.

| Image | First issued | Design | Slogan | Serial format | Serials issued | Notes |
