= Vehicle registration plates of Niger =

Republic of Niger
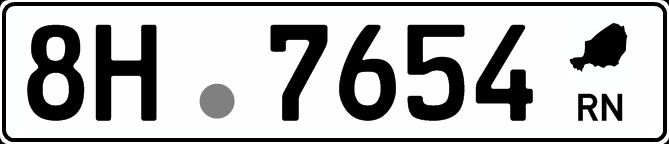
- Regular legal standard number plate from Niger.
- Country: Niger
- Country code: RN

Current series
- Size: 520 mm × 110 mm 20.5 in × 4.3 in
- Serial format: 1A2345 (1 being the regional code)
- Colour (front): Black on white
- Colour (rear): Black on white

The Republic of Niger requires every vehicle to have a vehicle registration plate.

== Private License Plates ==
License plates from Niger use license plates with similar dimensions to those in use in many European nations, however there is also come in a 2-lined format for vehicles with plate holders that do not fit the regular plates. Motorcycle license plates use the same format as cars. The current format for private vehicle license plates, introduced in 2005, uses the 1A 2345 format, where 1 represents the area code, A represents the series, and 2345 represents random digits. Regular plates have a white background with black characters. At the right side of the plate is a map of the country, either in black or with the Nigerien flag on it. Under the map, the official Nigerien international vehicle registration code (RN) is displayed.

=== Regional Codes ===
Each number represents one of the 8 regions of Niger.

- 1 - Agadez
- 2 - Diffa
- 3 - Dosso
- 4 - Maradi
- 5 - Tahoua
- 6 - Tillabéri
- 7 - Zinder
- 8 - Niamey

== Other Formats ==
=== Commercial vehicles ===
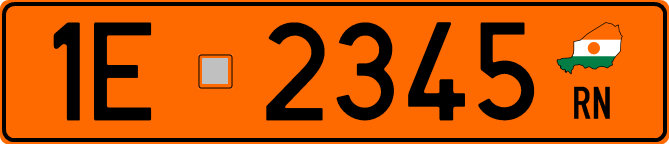
Commercial license plate

Commercial vehicles have license plates with red characters on an orange background. The format for these license plates is similar to that in use by private vehicles.

=== State transport ===
The government issues license plates that are to be used for state transport vehicles with the 12345ARN6 format, where 12345 represents random numbers, ARN is an abbreviation for "Administration of the Republic of Niger," and 6 represents the area code. These plates have a white background and blue characters.

12345ARN6

=== Military transport ===
The license plates used for military vehicles use 5 white numbers on a black background. These license plates have the Nigerien flag on the left side of them. Oftentimes, the license plates are painted directly on the vehicle.

=== Diplomatic license plates ===
License plates of higher officials of diplomatic missions have orange symbols on a green background and format 123CMD RN, where 123 represents country code, the letters CMD indicates that the person owning the car is a chairman of a diplomatic mission, and RN is the international vehicle registration code for Niger.

123CMD RN

==== Other diplomatic vehicles ====
License plates of other officials of diplomatic missions have orange symbols on a green background and format 123CD4 RN, where 123 represents the country code, the letters CD - indicates that the person owning the car is a diplomatic staff member, the number 4 represents the room, and RN is the international vehicle registration code of Niger.

123CD4 RN

== Old Licence Plates ==
Before 2005, licence plates were black and white and uses the format of 1234 AB 5.
