= Vehicle registration plates of Angola =

Republic of Angola
- A pre-2024 regular legal standard number plate from Luanda.
- Country: Angola
- Country code: None (unofficially using AO)

Current series
- Size: 520 mm × 110 mm 20.5 in × 4.3 in
- Serial format: ABC-01-23-DE (ABC being the regional code)
- Colour (front): Black on white
- Colour (rear): Black on white

Angola requires its residents to register their motor vehicles and display vehicle registration plates. Current plates are European standard 520 mm × 110 mm, and use Portuguese dies.

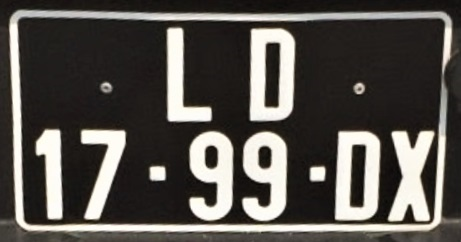
1996 Angola rear license plate

Image	First issued	Design	Slogan	Serial format	Serials issued	Notes
	1955-1996			AAA-##-##		
	1996-2024			AA-##-##-AA		LD = Luanda
