= Vehicle registration plates of Réunion =

Réunion requires its residents to register their motor vehicles and display vehicle registration plates. Current plates are European standard 520 mm × 110 mm, and use French stamping dies. The overseas departments and territories of France have three-digit codes, starting with 97, which was originally the single code for them all.

Image	First issued	Design	Slogan	Serial format	Serials issued	Notes
