= Vehicle registration plates of Denmark =

Denmark (Mainland)
- Current standard number plate from Denmark. Euroband is optional and is chosen at issuance.
- Country: Denmark
- Country code: DK

Current series
- Size: 520 mm × 110 mm (20 1/2 in × 4 5/16 in)
- Serial format: AB 12 345
- Colour (front): Black on white and red
- Colour (rear): Black on white and red

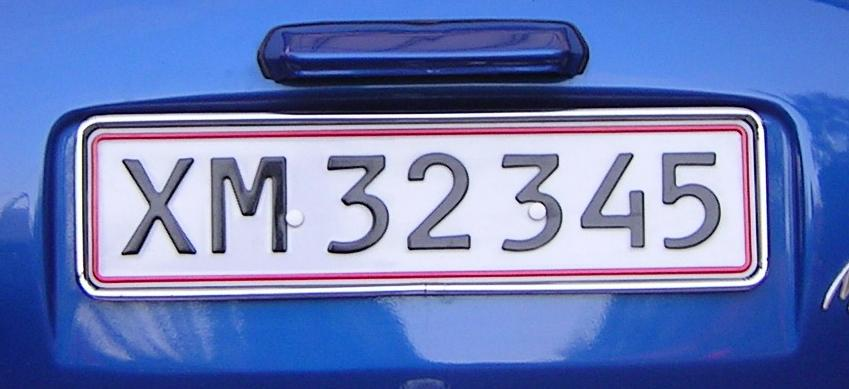

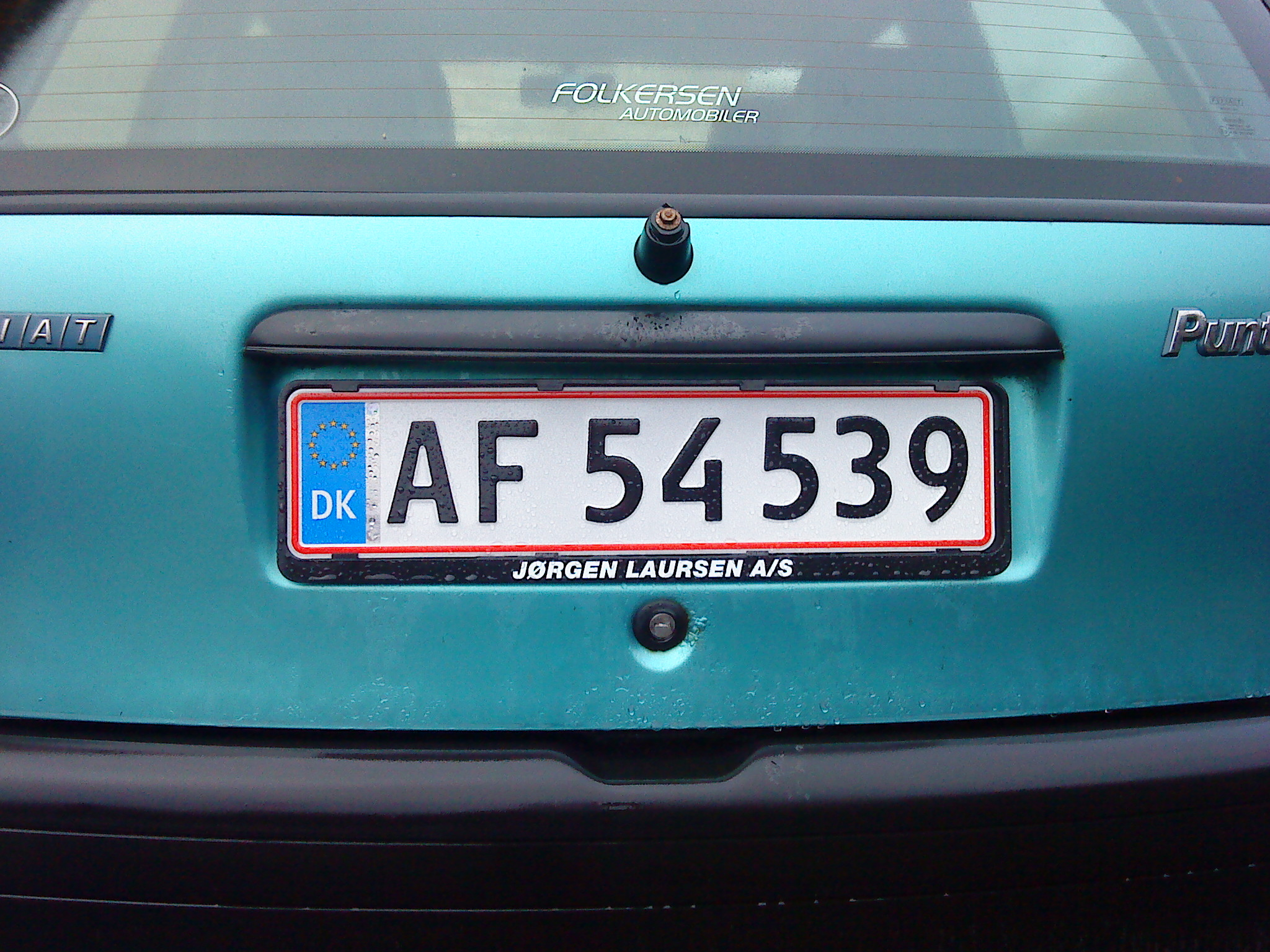
Since July 2009, car buyers have been able to choose between a license plate with or without an EU strip.

Vehicle registration plates in Denmark normally have two letters and five digits and are issued by authorities. Plates can be obtained at authorized car dealers, vehicle inspection stations or official registration centers (Skat Motor center). The combination is simply a serial and has no connection with a geographic location, but the digits have number series based on vehicle type. The country's official international road code is DK, excluding the Faroe Islands. Danish plates can be issued conforming to EU registration plate standards, allowing the vehicle to be driven throughout the EU/EEA without restrictions. Without an EU standard plate, a "DK" distinguishing sign must be displayed separately on the vehicle when driving abroad.

Danish registration plates do not follow the owner or the vehicle. When a vehicle is traded in with a dealership, the plates are usually turned in. The reason is that if the dealership just changes the ownership to themselves, they will be charged for insurance and taxes until the vehicle is sold to a new owner. If the dealer already has a buyer on hand or if the vehicle is sold directly by the owner to a buyer, the ownership can be changed and the plates transfer with the vehicle. This way a vehicle can, in principle, keep the same plate for its entire lifespan. However, this is rare and most Danish vehicles have numerous plates during their lifespans. When the car is recycled, the plates are surrendered so that no plates are recycled with the vehicle, unlike in Sweden or the UK where the plates follow the vehicle, which can often be seen at a scrap yard with the plates still on.

== Numbering before 2012 and format after 2012 ==
On the number combination one can see the type of a vehicle before 2012. Numbering after 2012 is completely random in order to allow for more combinations. Exceptions from this are diplomatic vehicles still using "76" and "77" and taxis/limousines using "98" and "99" The letters have no significance and are random. You can no longer determine the type of vehicle from the first two digits after 2012.

Vehicle type	Serial range	Highest assigned serial letters (without EU stripe)	Highest assigned serial letters (with EU stripe)
Large mopeds (max 45 km/h [28 mph])	001 - 699	RV	
Tractors	700 - 999	VU	DF
Trailers	10 00 - 29 99	YM	EF
Trailers and semi-trailers	55 00 - 99 99	PZ	HF
Small mopeds	5 500 - 9 999	XY	
Motorcycles	10 000 - 18 999	HT	AW
Tractors	19 000 - 19 499	ML	EG
Common vehicles (rectangular format)	20 000 - 59 999	FC	JF
Common vehicles (square format)	60 000 - 75 999	DT	AF
Diplomatic vehicles	76 000 - 76 999	AX	AF
Diplomatic vehicles (international organizations)	77 000 - 77 999	AN	AF
Trucks, buses, vans (rectangular format)	78 000 - 87 999	DH, privat: GA	AF, privat: FA
Trucks, buses, vans (square format)	88 000 - 97 999	XS, privat: GE	DG, privat: FK
Taxis and limousines (rectangular format)	98 000 - 99 699	JH	BF
Taxis and limousines (square format)	99 700 - 99 999	BN	AW

== Types ==
Type	Appearance	
Private use		The grey stripe in the lower image represents the security hologram fitted to all new plates. Registration tax: Up to 150% of car value. VAT: 25% of the sum of the car value + Registration tax
Commercial use		Rear seats not allowed. Only for use in commercial sense. Private use is illegal. Registration tax: 0% VAT: 0% (only commercial transport allowed)
"Parrot-plate" "Papegøje-plade"		Commercial vehicles that can also be used privately (this to make sure that nobody uses tax relieved vans (yellow plates) for personal use). Rear seats not allowed. Registration tax: around 50% of car value. VAT: 25% of the sum of the car value + Registration tax
Diplomatic use		Blue plates with white text. The same format as the (old) format for private vehicles. Diplomatic plates always use the numbers "76" and "77" and are divided into diplomatic plates and international organizations, like UN. EU strip and hologram now on all new plates.
Historical		Black background, white text.
Armed forces		(top-down): Army, Navy, Air Force, and the newer symbol common to all three branches.
Royal		The King's personal car used for official occasions only features a royal crown on a white background.
DEMA		For use by the Danish Emergency Management Agency (Civil defense)
"Fixed" temporary plate		For the special use of vehicle manufacturers, importers, distributors or car repairers
Temporary export plate		Composed of a red field showing the year of validity and five digits
Vanity plates		These plates cost kr.9,180 (€1,230) per set as of 2021 and must be renewed each eight years at a cost of kr.8,000 (€1,070). The plates can be transferred from one vehicle to another. This is not possible for standard plates. 26 Roman letters, numbers and the Danish letters Æ, Ø and Å can be used in combination. The combination cannot be in the same format as standard plates. The EU strip can be chosen optionally.
Ambulances and fire trucks		These plates employ the insignia of the local fire brigade between the serials; this insignia often features a version the local coat of arms
Airport Vehicles		These plates are only used by airports in Denmark. One may find them in Copenhagen/København (Kastrup) Airport, Aalborg Airport, and Billund Airport. The letters are always and only RF but the numbers differ.
Gooseneck trailers/block truck		These license plates are used on Gooseneck trailers/blocktrucks in Denmark.

Hearses are registered as yellow-plate cars (commercial use). The actual plates are, however, white (personal use), reflecting the view that the deceased is a passenger rather than commercial freight.

== EU plates ==
A new design with an EU stripe was expected in 2008, but was thereafter delayed to 12 October 2009. The EU stripe is, however, currently optional. In preparation for the new design, the plate font was slightly condensed on some new plates issued after mid-2008. Since July 2009, buyers of a car could pick a license plate with or without an EU strip.

If a Danish registered vehicle does not have the plate with the EU stripe then it must be equipped with an approved oval DK-sign when driving abroad. If one drives both with a car and a caravan/trailer, both must bear the label. The sign shall be elliptical (oval) 175 mm × 115 mm (7 by 4 1/2 inches), white background with black lettering. The letters must be 80 mm (3 inches) in height, the distance between them shall be 10 mm (3/8 inch), and there shall be no advertising.

== Autonomous countries ==
=== Faroe Islands ===
Faroe Islands, Kingdom of Denmark
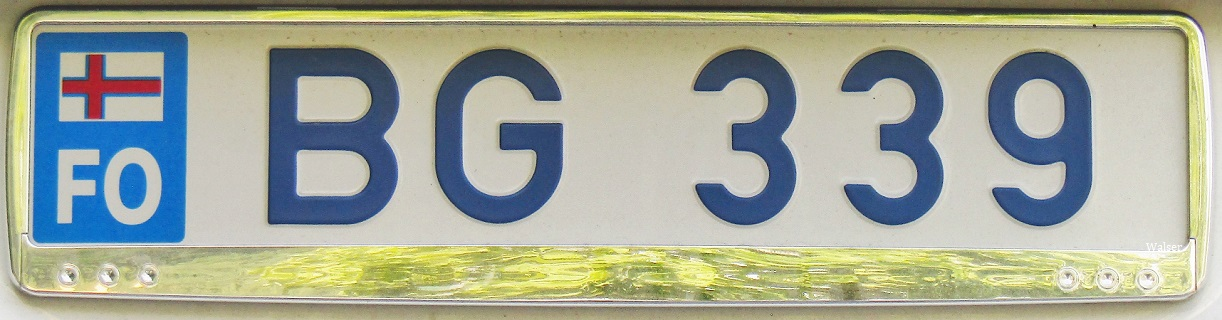
- Current regular private legal standard number plate from the Faroes.
- Country code: FO

Current series
- Size: 520 mm × 110 mm (20 1/2 in × 4 5/16 in)
- Serial format: AB 123
- Colour (front): Blue on white
- Colour (rear): Blue on white

Cars registered in the Faroe Islands before 1996 have plates with white background, black text in Danish style, but with black edge and only one letter, F.
Cars registered after 1996 have white background, blue text in their own style, two letters and three digits. There is a blue stripe to the left with the Faroese flag and the international road code "FO". The Faroe Islands are outside the EU.

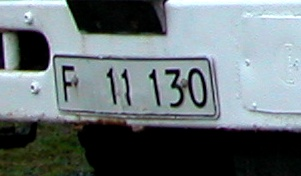
Pre-1996 Faroe Islands plate

=== Greenland ===
Greenland, Kingdom of Denmark
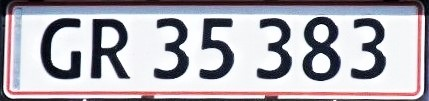
- Current regular private legal standard number plate from Greenland.
- Country code: DK

Current series
- Size: 520 mm × 110 mm (20 1/2 in × 4 5/16 in)
- Serial format: GR 12 345; GL 12 345
- Colour (front): Black on white and red
- Colour (rear): Black on white and red

Plates have a white background, and black text in Danish style with the serial letters "GR" and "GL" reserved for Greenland. The EU stripe is not applicable since Greenland is a non-EU member. Greenland unofficially uses the international registration code KN, but the official code to use is DK. The only way to transport a vehicle to or from Greenland is by container ship, which is time-consuming and expensive due to the long distance, so it is rare for Greenlandic vehicles to drive outside Greenland.

== Confusion with Norwegian plates ==
In 1971 Norway began with two letters and five digits, just after Denmark. In the beginning there was an informal system of avoiding the same code for a Norwegian and a Danish car, in which some letter combinations were used by Norway and some by Denmark. Norway having geographical codes used a higher number of letter combinations than Denmark. This was later abandoned, because of larger number of vehicles, so now a Norwegian and a Danish car can have same registration code, although they have national stripes now, and have always needed a national mark outside their country.
