= Vehicle registration plates of Estonia =

Republic of Estonia/Eesti Vabariik
- Current Estonian license plate type A1.
- Country: Estonia
- Country code: EST

Current series
- Size: 520 mm × 110 mm 20.5 in × 4.3 in
- Serial format: 123 ABC (for regular plates)
- Colour (front): Black on white
- Colour (rear): Black on white

Vehicle registration plates of Estonia are divided into 18 categories, the most common of these (A1) is composed of three numbers and three letters (e.g. 123 ABC). Most registration plate types have black letters on a white background, and the plates are the same size and length as other European plates (520 × 113 mm). Previously the first of the three letters indicated the region of Estonia in which the car was registered; however, as of 2013, this is no longer the case. The third digit from the numbers indicated states when the car is due an inspection. It can be inspected up to 2 months after that digit. The registration plates are printed on an aluminium sheet with minimum thickness of 1 mm and must fulfil the requirements of ISO 7591:1982. All plates are issued with the blue European Union identification label, except types A9 and B2.

== Types of plates ==
These are the different types of plates in use in Estonia:

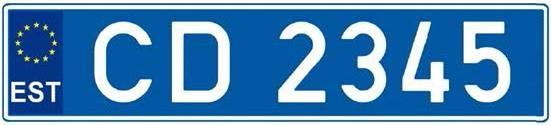
Diplomatic license plate

- A1 – Plates for general use on cars and trailers (vehicle categories M, N and O).
- A2 – Special-order plate. Must contain at least one letter and one number up to a total of 9 characters. Numbers and letters may not alternate.
- A3 – Plates for general use with reduced size. Usually used on cars with American origin, contains two numbers and three letters (historically beginning with Z).
- A4, A5 – General diplomatic plates with white letters on a blue background. A4 plates consist of two letters (CD or AT for administrative/techinal staff) and four numbers, A5 are restricted to heads of diplomatic missions and consists of the letters CMD and three numbers.
- A6, A7 – Diplomatic plates with reduced size. A6 plates consist of two letters (CD or AT) and three numbers, A7 are restricted to heads of diplomatic missions and consist of the letters CMD and two numbers.
- A8 – Transferable plates, used by car dealers. Consist of the letters PROOV (Estonian for test) and four numbers.
- A9 – Plates for classic and antique cars and trailers. Old vehicles are specifically defined vehicles (at least 35 years old) that have been granted an official old vehicle status. The plates consist of one letter and three numbers in white on a black background.
- A10 – Plates for racing cars, two letters, which are SP (sport) and four numbers that start with 0 in white on a red background.
- A11 – Transferable plates with reduced size.
- B1 – Plates for motorbikes and terrain vehicles (ATV's, snowmobiles and similar), consist of two numbers and two letters.
- B2 – Plates for classic and antique motorbikes, mopeds and terrain vehicles, similar to A9 but consist of one letter and three numbers.
- B3 – Plates for mopeds. Mopeds are two to four-wheeled vehicles with engine displacement of 50 cm^{3} or less and maximum speed of 45 km/h or less. The plates consist of three numbers and one letter in black on a green background.
- D1 – Transit plates for cars, consist of two letters, a dash and four numbers in red on a white background.
- D2 – Transit plates for motorbikes, mopeds, tractors and special-purpose vehicles and their trailers, similar to D1 but with three numbers instead of four.
- E1 – Plates for tractors, special-purpose vehicles and their trailers, consist of two letters and four numbers on the next line.

=== Diplomatic codes ===
These are the two-digit codes used on Estonian diplomatic plates, beginning in 1992.

Code	Country	Code	Country	Code	Country	Code	Country
10	Sweden	20	Australia	30	United States	40	North Macedonia
11	Germany	21	Norway	31	Vatican City	41	Bulgaria
12	Hungary	22	Spain	32	Greece	42	Moldova
13	Canada	23	Hungary	33	China	43	Azerbaijan
14	Finland	24	Spain	34	Poland	44	Brazil
15	France	25	Latvia	35	Japan	46	Romania
16	Denmark	26	New Zealand	36	Ukraine	49	European Union
17	United Kingdom	27	Austria	37	Belarus	50	Nordic Council
18	Netherlands	28	Russia	38	Portugal	51	International Monetary Fund
19	Italy	29	Lithuania	39	Georgia		

== History ==
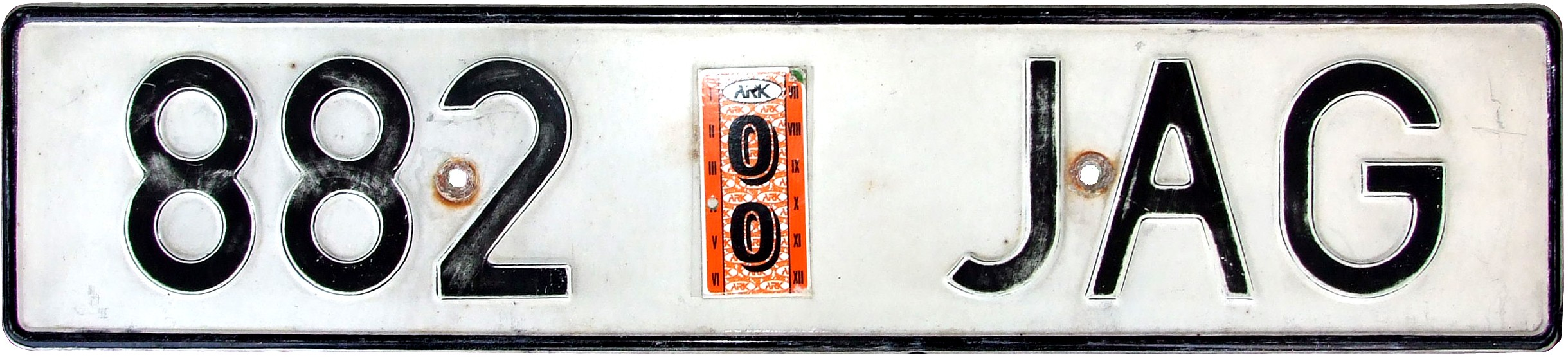
Former Estonian plate, issued in 1998

Pre-1991 Estonian (USSR) registration plate

On July 1, 1907, the City Board of Tallinn issued a decree concerning the moving, registering and taxation of motor vehicles. The cars only had a rear license plate, whose color varied every year. Other city council in the gouvernements of Estonia and Livonia issued similar decrees, some of which were still valid until the mid-1920s. The size and color of the plate was decided independently by every council. Chiefly they only carried the order of registration, sometimes the name of where the plate had been registered or a shortened form of it.

On August 27, 1920, the City Council of Tallinn favored the decree "On the compulsory registration of automobiles and motorcycles within the limits of the city of Tallinn," an evolution of the Tsarist decree. Cars still only had a rear license plate, and the color still varied every year. The plates were made of tin carrying numbers starting with 1.

On December 7, 1922, the decree was changed. Motorists were ordered "upon fastening a tin order number to the rear of their vehicle, to add a white iron plate in a visible spot in front of the car (under the radiator) on which the order number given by the city council has been printed." Since car owners were able to do a test drive before the technical inspection, a "test" number valid for three days was issued. It had to differ from the current number by shape and size. The plates of the previous tax year had to be changed to the current ones until May 15.

From 1923, Tallinn license plates became four-digit. Plates starting with 1 (from 1001) belonged to members of the Union of Estonian car owners as per a contract signed with the city council of Tallinn, and plates starting with 2 (from 2001) were issued for other cars. This decree lasted until the end of the 1925/26 tax season. From then on all cars registered in Tallinn had unitary license plates starting with 2. Motorcycles were registered differently, the numbers were three-digit starting with 101.

In 1925, when the Tallinn and Harjumaa plates were manufactured in Aleksander Karja's engraving shop, the font changed. The color of the plates still varied per tax year. For the 1928/29 season they were green with black font. For the following 1929/30 tax season the financing sector of the city council planned for plates with white font on black background, but the new regulation for registering motor vehicles declared unitary license plates on May 14, 1929, which were required to be changed until July 1. Because this regulation appeared after the beginning of the new tax year, the new black plates were already prepared and had to be melted down. The new regulation had something important missing: test numbers were now exclusive to car dealers and working places. If a civilian repaired a car or motorcycle in his own home, he lacked the legal chance to bring his vehicle to the technical overview, as test numbers could not be given out to private persons and driving without a number was prohibited as well. As a solution, the city council of Tallinn issued the 1929 tax year plates as test numbers for private car and motorcycle owners. These were now red with black font starting from 3001 for cars and 301 for motorcycles, written above the numbers on the rear plate was PROOV (test). This started a discussion in the city council with the Road Ministry when its representatives saw cars and motorcycles with red license plates on the street. Nevertheless, in August 1929, the decree was accepted by the Road Ministry and allowed vehicle owners to drive to the technical overview without a number, but with a 3-day test plate on the basis of a written declaration. This decree remained unchanged until the end of the first republic.

After the USSR's pact of mutual assistance in the fall of 1939, several Red Army trucks without license plates arrived in Estonia. As it was forbidden to drive without license plates in Estonia, they were given Estonian license plates. One such truck with the plate A-2798 is known to have been involved in an accident with a 14 year old cyclist on April 17, 1940.

On April 19, 1941, the Estonian SSR Informer (Eesti NSV Teataja) published the People's Commission of the Estonian SSR's decree for registering vehicles. Following this, the People's Commission of the Interior's militia government was missioned to replace all old license plates and technical passes with the new ones until June 1, 1941. The basis for the plates was the People's Commission of the Interior of the USSR decree on registering motor vehicles from July 22, 1939. The new plates were black with white ciphers in the format ER-12-34 and ES-12-34, but differed in size and shape completely from other Soviet license plates. Manufactured in Estonia, the front and rear plates were 112x340 mm and with the 1939 rift (Soviet rear license plates were square at the time) ER motorcycle plates were 85x255 mm, with the number printed on both sides on the front plate.

On November 18, 1941, the German occupying powers issued a decree for registering and reregistering vehicles. The plates were white with "Est" in black letters and a five digit number. On top of this, a so-called consent of registration, the Zulassungsausweis (at first called Zulassungsbescheinigung) had to be attached inside the windscreen.

For reasons unknown, General Commissioner in Estonia Litzmann did not like the decree issued by the Estonian Home-Rule Government and stopped the issue of the "Est" plates in early January 1942. Until the end of the year, all plates issued with occupational technical passes and registration consents were valid:

1. Republic of Estonia license plates (most of them 1940, a few 1939)

2. 1941 ESSR ER and ES plates

3. Estonian Home-Rule Est plates.

From January 1, 1943, the German highway code was valid in Estonia and all local vehicles were issued German plates starting with RO (Reichskommissariat Ostland) Estonian numbers were limited to RO-10000 – 29999.

These plates were issued until the Red Army occupied Estonia in the fall of 1944.

The first, post-Soviet, Estonian registration plates (1991) were composed of three numbers, with a licence label in the middle of the plate. The labels were dropped in 2004.

Only two suffixes were used on Soviet era plates: ЕА and ЭС. Neither identified any specific town or city, but rather served to inform that the vehicle had been registered in the Estonian SSR. There were plans to introduce an additional ЕС suffix, but as this occurred just before the collapse of the Soviet Union, the mark was subsequently allocated to the Russian city of St. Petersburg.

=== Car designations (1991–2019) ===
Upon their first registration in Estonia, Vehicles were assigned registration plates, which first letter corresponds to the ARK office they were issued at (unless custom combinations were ordered for an additional fee).

Since the majority of vehicles imported or newly sold are first registered in Tallinn, its surrounding, or Tartu, plates starting with B, M, and T prevailed until the early 2020s. For this reason, random series are issued starting August 2019.

- A (until 08/2007), B (08/2007 - 01/2019), D (from 01/2019) – Tallinn
- D – Viljandimaa
- F – Pärnumaa
- G – Valgamaa
- H – Hiiumaa
- I – Ida-Virumaa outside of Narva
- J – Jõgevamaa
- K – Saaremaa (K for Kuressaare)
- L – Raplamaa
- M – Harjumaa outside of Tallinn (M for the ARK office located in Maardu, which later moved to Saue)
- N – Narva
- O – Põlvamaa
- P – Järvamaa (P for Paide)
- R – Lääne-Virumaa (R for Rakvere)
- S – Läänemaa (S for Haapsalu)
- T – Tartumaa
- V – Võrumaa

== Special plates ==
Plate used on a Defense Forces vehicle

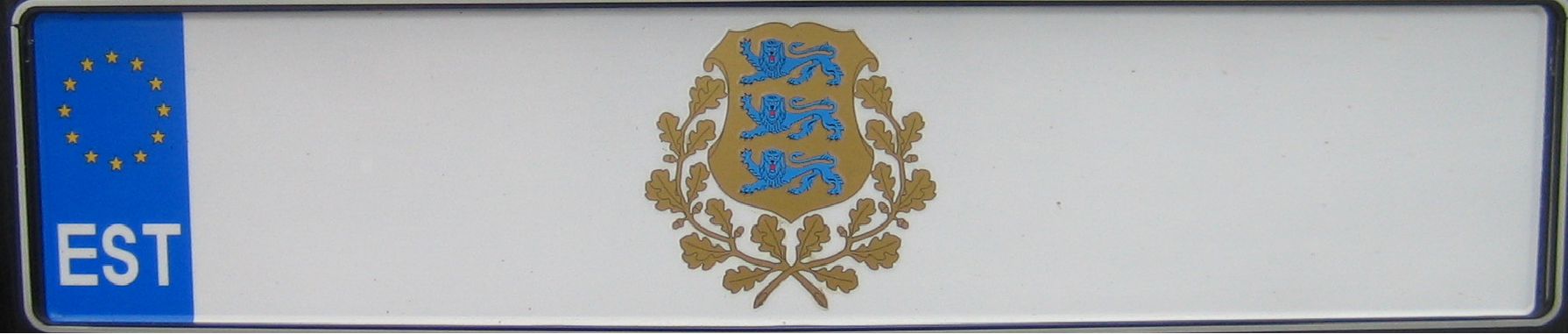
Plate used on the car of the President

- Temporary license plates are printed on a yellow background.
- For vehicles registered in Estonian Defense Forces vehicle register, white characters on a black background are used. Two letter combinations start with K, three letter combinations with EK.
- On the President's vehicle the official plate number is not used and the plate bears the coat of arms of Estonia instead.
