= Vehicle registration plates of Latvia =

Republic of Latvia/Latvijas Republika
- Current standard Latvian car license plate.
- Country: Latvia
- Country code: LV

Current series
- Size: 520 mm × 110 mm 20.5 in × 4.3 in
- Serial format: AB-1234 (for regular plates)
- Colour (front): Black on white
- Colour (rear): Black on white

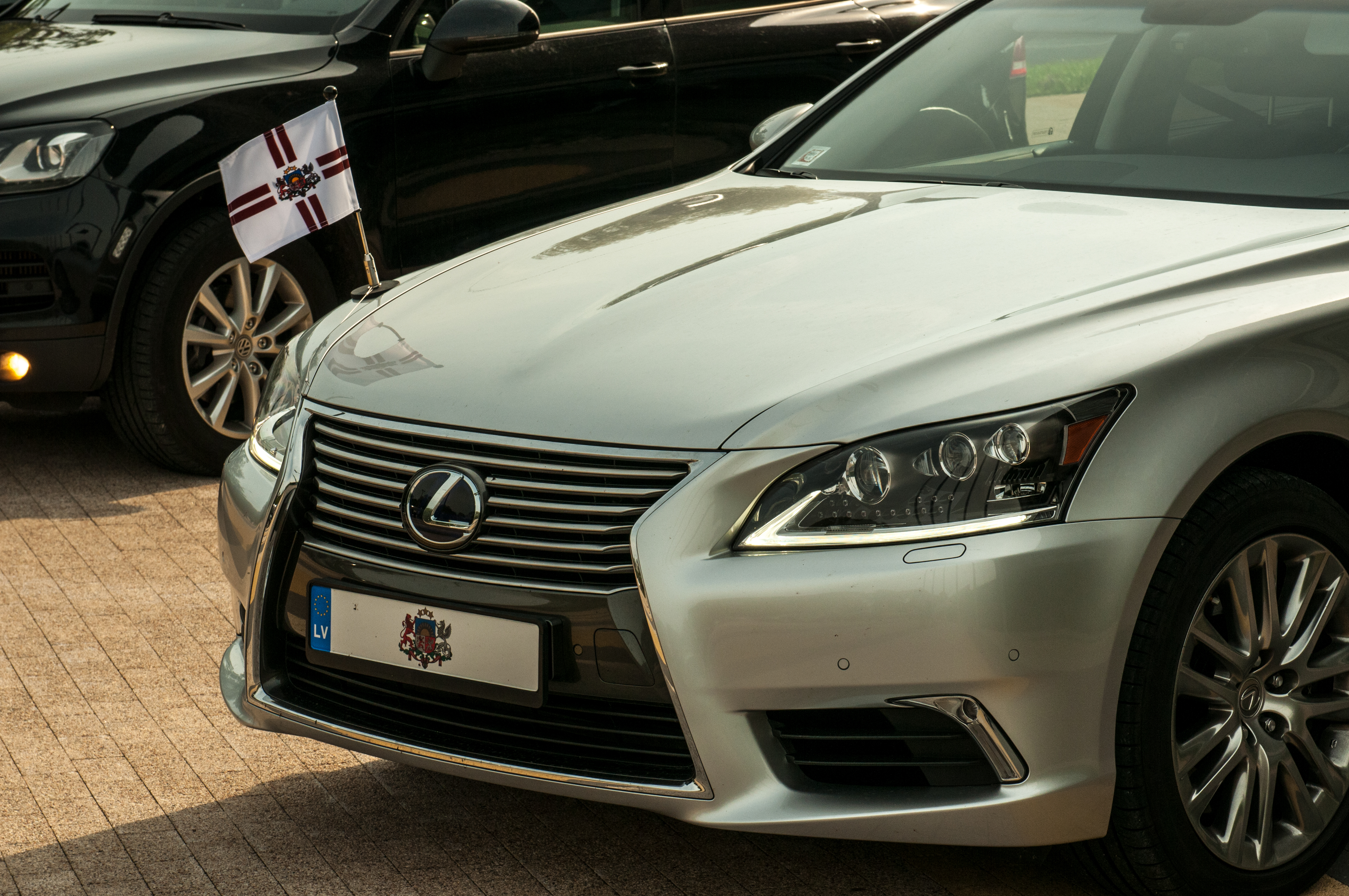
A license plate indicating that the car belongs to the President of Latvia

Vehicle registration plates of Latvia consist of two letters (trailers plates have one letter), a hyphen and one to four numbers (depending on the age of registration), e.g., AB-1234,

== Colour and dimensions ==

Current plates have black characters on white reflective material for both front and rear plates. After Latvia regained independence in 1991, vehicle registration plates of the Soviet Union with Latin letters LA and LT were used until 1993, when the new type of vehicle registration plates were introduced. Up until 2004 a small Latvian national flag with the initials LV would have been used on the left-side of the plate. Ever since Latvia joined the European Union, the EU blue label has been included on the license plate with the initials LV. Front number plates are 520 mm x 111 mm in size. Rear plates may be:

- 520 mm x 110 mm ("A Type" Standard)
- 280 mm x 200 mm ("B Type" Square, used mostly on SUVs)
- 240 mm x 130 mm ("C Type" Used mostly on Motorcycles)
- 300 mm x 110 mm ("E Type" Small, used mostly on American and some Japanese RHD cars that have small place for plate). This type of plate can only include 4 symbols without hyphen, e.g., AB12, however a hyphen is included on front plate.
- 177 mm x 130 mm ("F Type" Used mostly on Motorcycles)
- 133 mm x 165 mm ("G Type" Used only on Mopeds)
- 133 mm x 165 mm ("H Type" Used only on Off-road vehicles)

== Typeface ==
All Latvian plates use the Austria typeface, closely related to the German DIN 1451. Most noticeable changes include the forms of the letter J, as well as the digits 6 and 9 and rounded corners.

== Car designations ==
Latvian license plates do not have any particular designation coding confirmed. However, Latvian army cars and trucks have LA letters on plates meaning Latvijas Armija and VS letters mean Vēsturiskais Spēkrats (Vintage car).

== Personalized plates ==
The Latvian government allows registering personalized plates. In 2006, CSDD decided to increase price from 542.80 LVL to 2,500 LVL, because the old price became too affordable. Personalized plates can consist from two to eight symbols: letters, numbers or spaces. The same symbol can be repeated maximum 3 times without breaks (for example, "XXXIXXX").

== Special plates ==
Taxi license plate

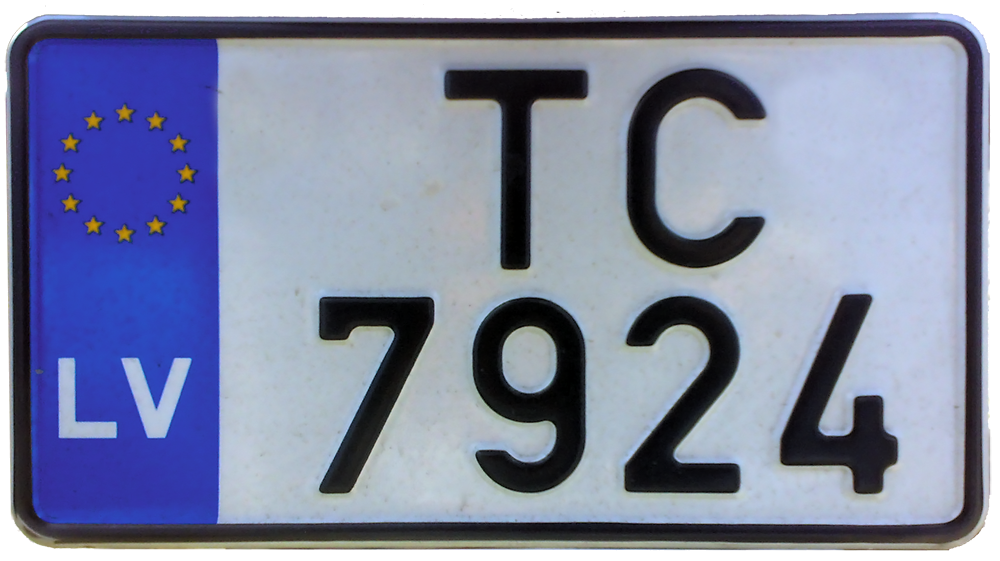
Motorcycle license plate

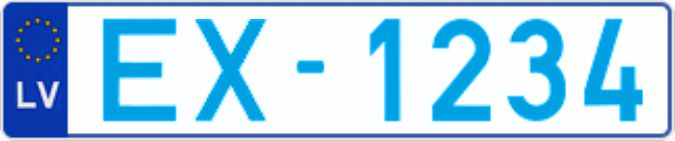
Electric engine license plate

- On taxis, the plate would be coloured black letters on a yellow background, and would consist of two letters, a hyphen and one to four numbers. The two letters would be TX, meaning taxi. After all numbers within TX range were used, TQ letters were used.
- On trailers and semi-trailers, the license plates consist of one letter, a hyphen and four numbers, or one letter, a hyphen and three numbers, one letter (the last sheme introduced in 2020s), and are coloured black letters on a white background.
- On motorcycles, the license plates have the same colours as the ordinary plates, but the shape and font size is different, also letters would be TA, or TB, or TC etc.
- On electric cars the coding also consists of two letters, a hyphen and four numbers, and are colored light blue letters on a white background or light blue letters on a yellow background for electric taxis.

== Diplomatic plates ==
On vehicles of the diplomatic corps, the coding also consists of two letters, a hyphen and four numbers. The plates would be coloured black letters on a red background. The first two letters would be CD, meaning Corps Diplomatique (one letter C also is used). And The first two numbers indicate a country or organization as listed in the table below.

Diplomatic license plate 12 - Canada

| Code | Country |
|---|---|
| 1 | Germany |
| 2 | Sweden |
| 3 | Iceland |
| 4 | France |
| 5 | United States |
| 6 | Denmark |
| 7 | Belgium |
| 8 | Czech Republic |
| 9 | Poland |
| 10 | United Kingdom |
| 11 | Finland |
| 12 | Canada |
| 13 | Norway |
| 14 | Italy |
| 17 | Ireland |
| 18 | Norway |
| 19 | Netherlands |
| 20 | Hungary |
| 22 | China |
| 24 | Austria |
| 28 | Japan |
| 30 | Turkey |
| 33 | Russia |
| 34 | Switzerland |
| 35 | Estonia |
| 36 | European Union |
| 40 | Portugal |
| 43 | South Korea |
| 45 | Ukraine |
| 49 | European Union |
| 55 | South Korea |
| 58 | Uzbekistan |
| 59 | Moldova |
| 67 | International Committee of the Red Cross |
| 70 | Slovakia |
| 84 | Georgia |
| 99 | International organizations |
| 100 | Cambodia |
| 107 | Azerbaijan |
| 117 | United Arab Emirates |

== See also ==
- Vehicle registration plates of the European Union
