= Vehicle registration plates of San Marino =

San Marino
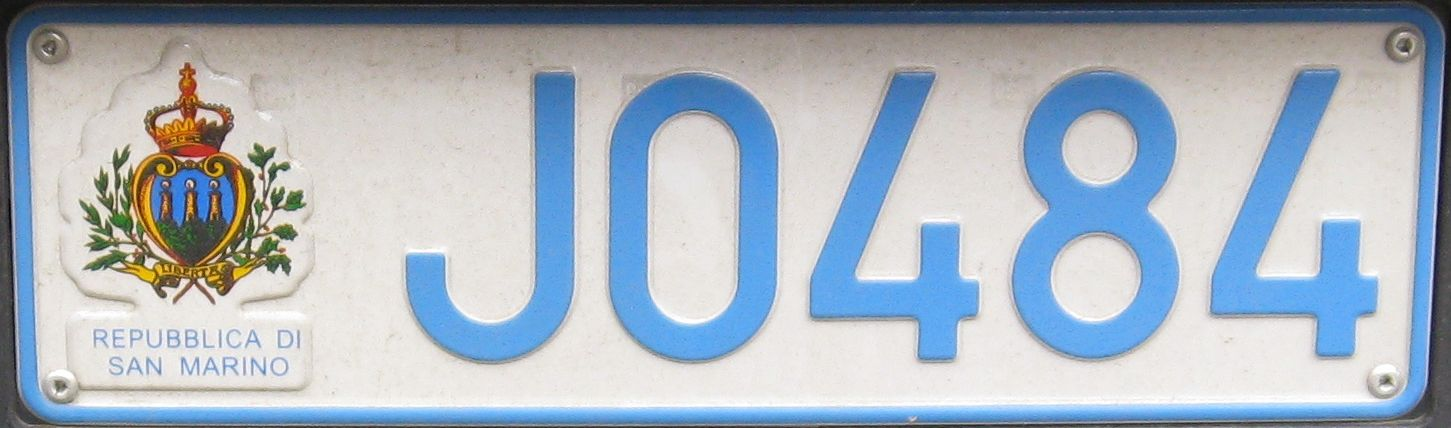
- Regular legal standard number plate from San Marino.
- Country: San Marino
- Country code: RSM

Current series
- Size: 390 mm × 120 mm 15.4 in × 4.7 in 300 mm × 100 mm 11.8 in × 3.9 in
- Serial format: Not standard
- Colour (front): RAL 5017
- Colour (rear): RAL 5017

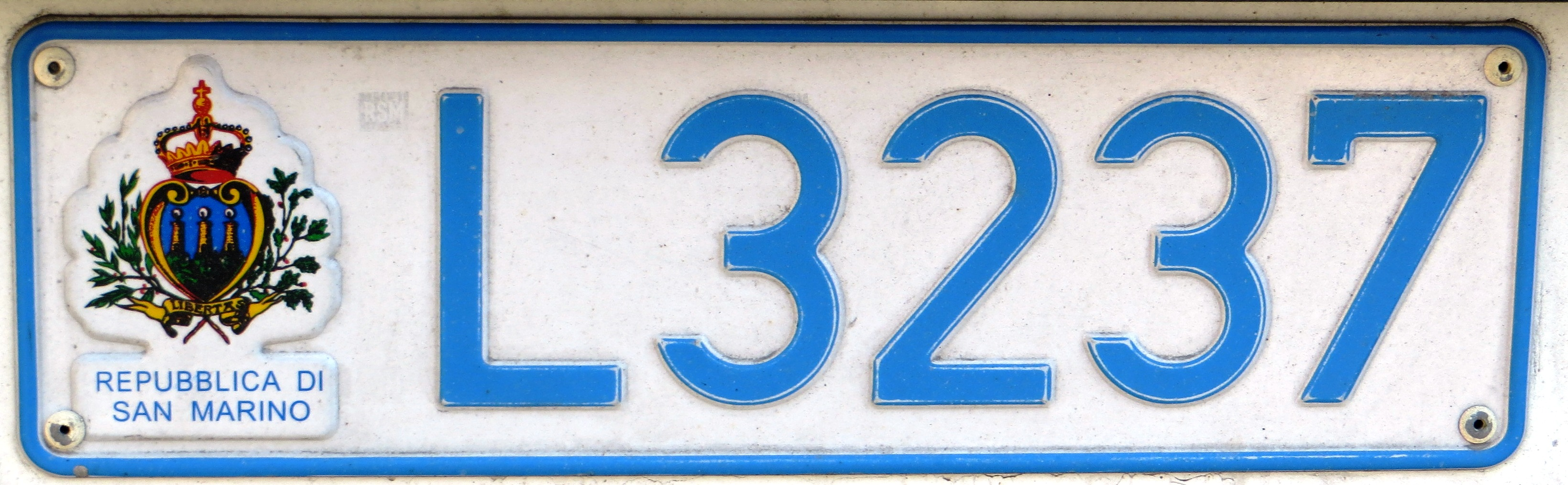
Typical Sammarinese motor car number plate

Sammarinese authorities license private vehicles with distinctive licence plates which are white with blue figures, usually a letter followed by up to four numbers. To the left of these figures is displayed the national coat of arms of San Marino. Custom licence plates were offered starting in 2004. In 2023, there were format and design changes: a new reduced size front plate was introduced, measuring 300 x 100 mm, and the color of the serial number font was darkened from light blue to medium blue (RAL 5017). The new design does not include the international country code "RSM" which could instead be displayed in an oval decal.

There are 220 km (135 mi) of roads in the country: the main road is the San Marino Highway.

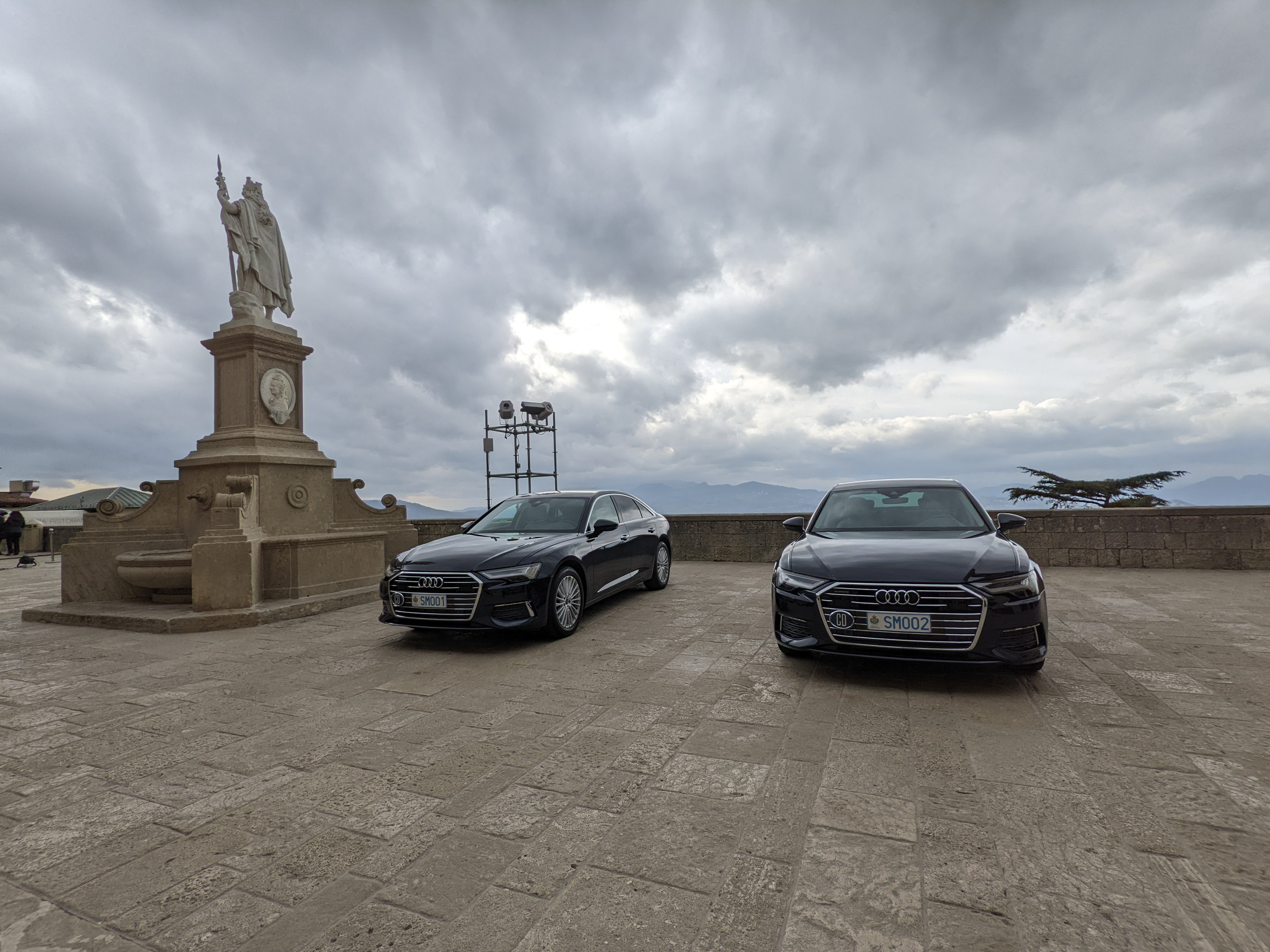
Limousines that serve as transport to the Captains Regent of the San Marino with their license plates as of 2022.

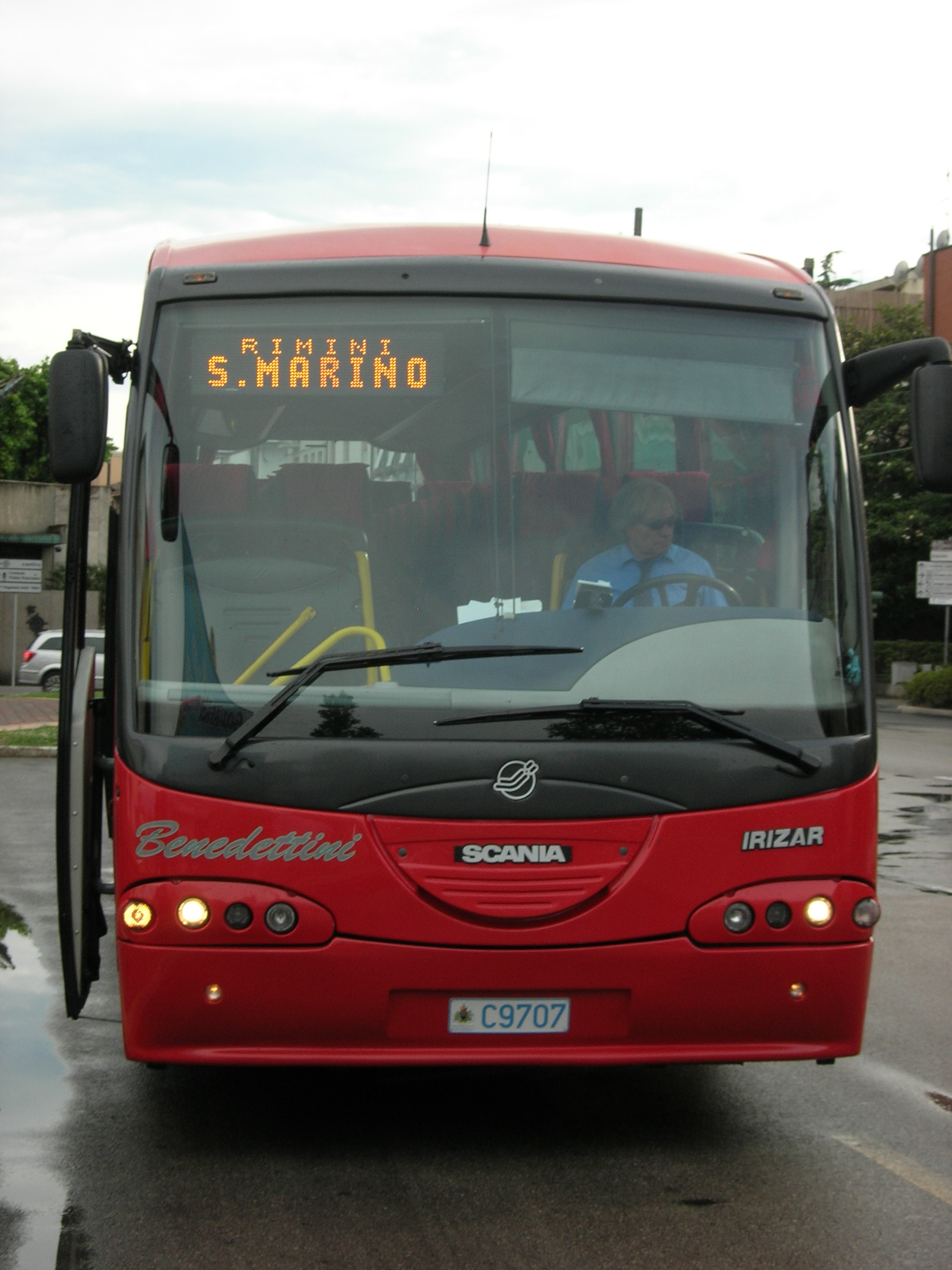
Bus in San Marino with its license plate

== Special plates ==
Code	Type	Image
CD	Diplomatic corps	
CRS	Red Cross	
GE	Gendarmeria	
POLIZIA	Civil police, Guardia di Rocca	
PROVA	Tests	
R	Trailer	
VU	Vigili Urbani	
VE	Electric Vehicles	
E	Export	
Year sticker	Temporary	

== See also ==
- Vehicle registration plates of Italy
- Vehicle registration plates of Vatican City
