= Vehicle registration plates of Andorra =

Principality of Andorra/Principat d'Andorra
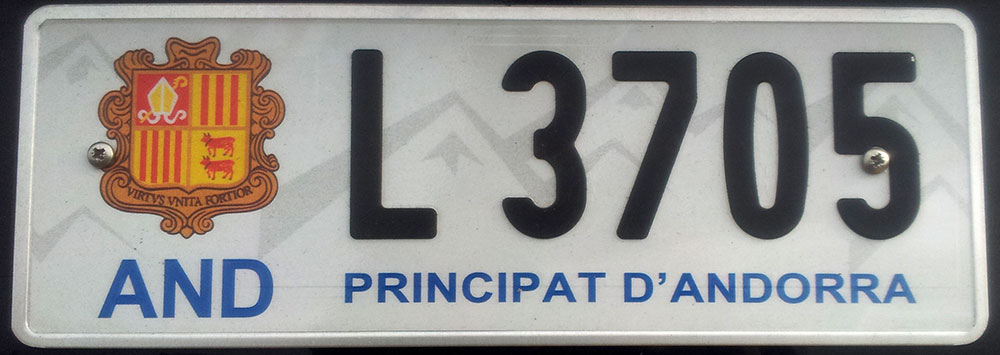
- Andorran license plate (2011-current).
- Country: Andorra
- Country code: AND

Current series
- Slogan: Principat d'Andorra
- Size: 340 mm × 120 mm 13.4 in × 4.7 in
- Serial format: A 1234 (for standard plates)
- Colour (front): Black on white
- Colour (rear): Black on white

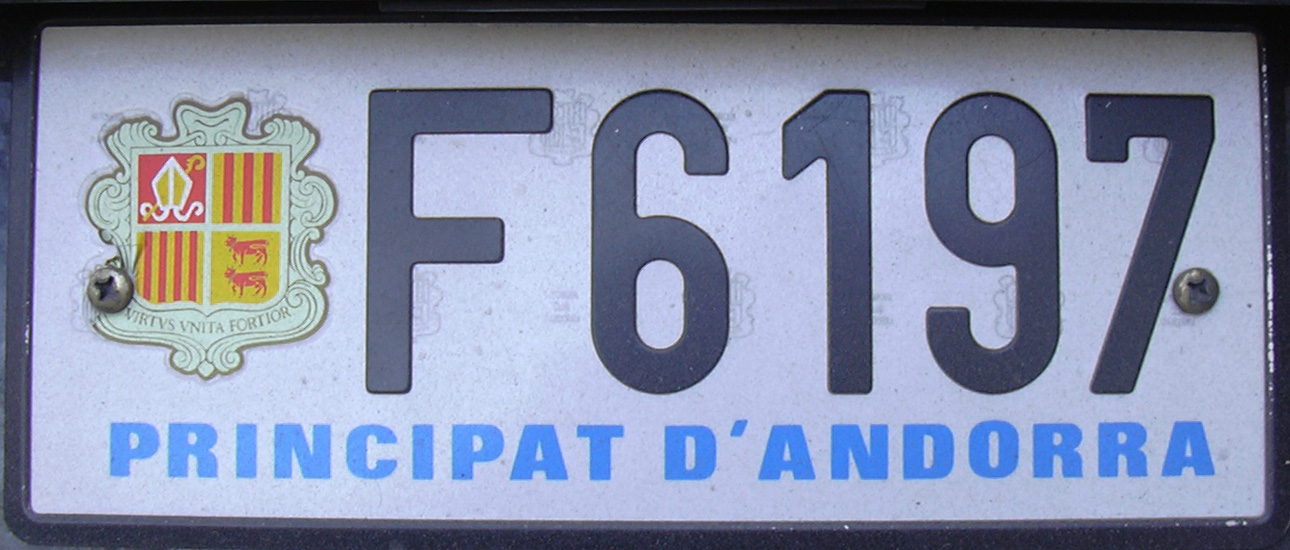
Andorran license plate (1989–2011)

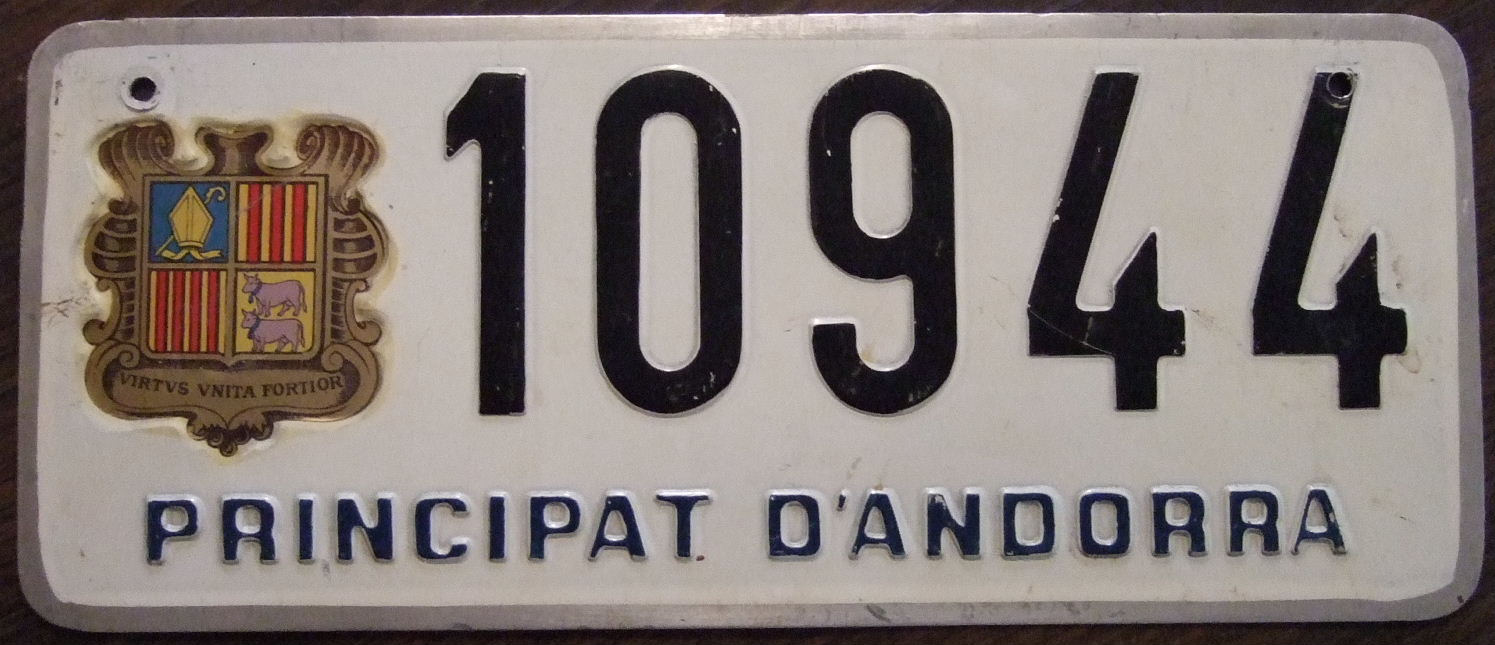
1970s plate

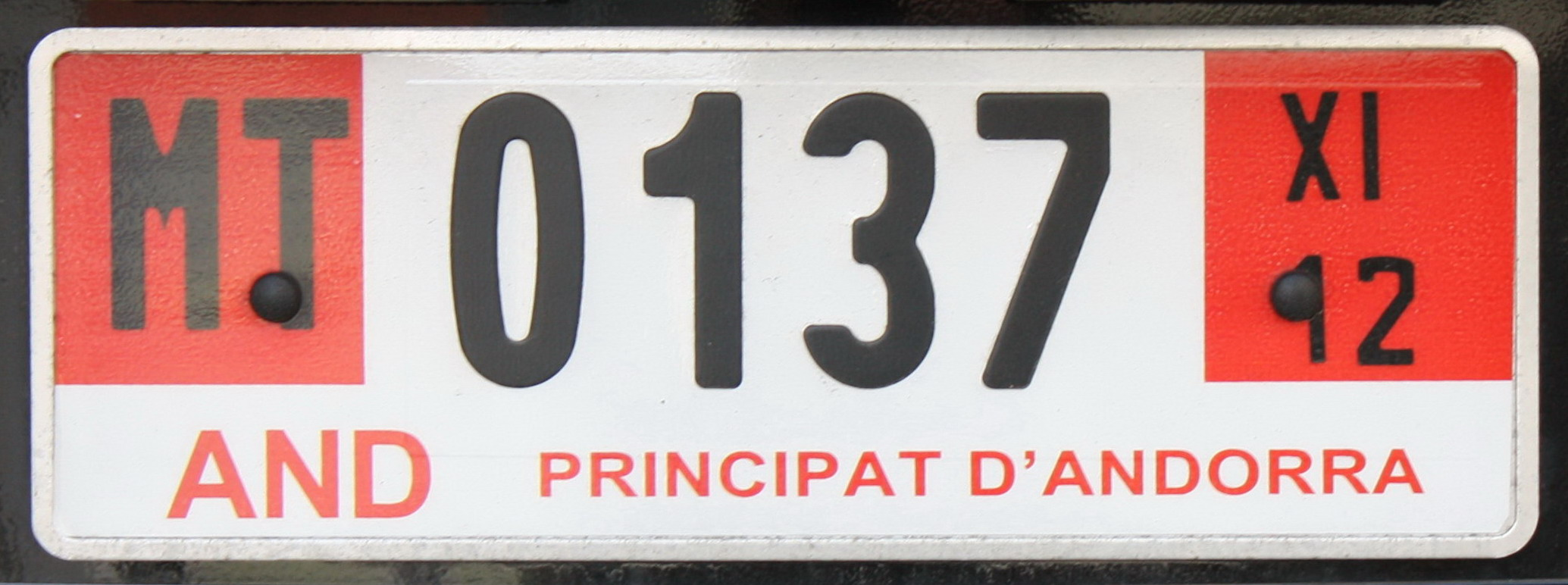
Temporary plate

In Andorra, vehicle registration plates are composed of one letter and four digits (e.g. A1234), and have the coat of arms of Andorra and country code (AND) to the left of the serial and Principat d'Andorra in blue below the serial. The plates feature embossed black serials on a white background.

== History ==
The first Andorran license plates were issued in around 1930 and also featured black serials on white background. These were composed of the letters "AND" followed by four numbers, e.g., AND 1234. A new series was issued in 2011. They now feature country code (AND) in the bottom the coat of arms.

== Special plates ==
- MT - Used as a temporary plate, the MT means Matrícula Temporal. The plates are composed of two letters in a red box, four numbers and the expiry date in another red box.
- PROVA - Used as a dealer plate. The plates are composed of max. three numbers in a red color, expiration year in left of plate, and letter PROVA in the bottom. The color of the plate is red on green.
- X nnn X - Diplomatic car plate. The plates are composed of one letter, max. three number and one letter. The color of the plate is white on light blue. The last letter of the plate can stand for either “E” for Spain, “F” for France or “P” for Portugal
- VEHICLES ESPECIALS - Special vehicles and three numbers only. The color of the plate is red on white.
- Official vehicles use Andorra's tricolor flag without emblems.

== Sources ==
- https://aca.ad/serveis/plaques-de-matricula
- http://diariandorra.ad/index.php?option=com_k2&view=item&id=10570
- http://www.elperiodicdandorra.com/tema-del-dia/9101-matricules-menys-altes-i-mes-europeitzades.html
