= Vehicle registration plates of Luxembourg =

Lëtzebuerg/Luxembourg/Luxemburg
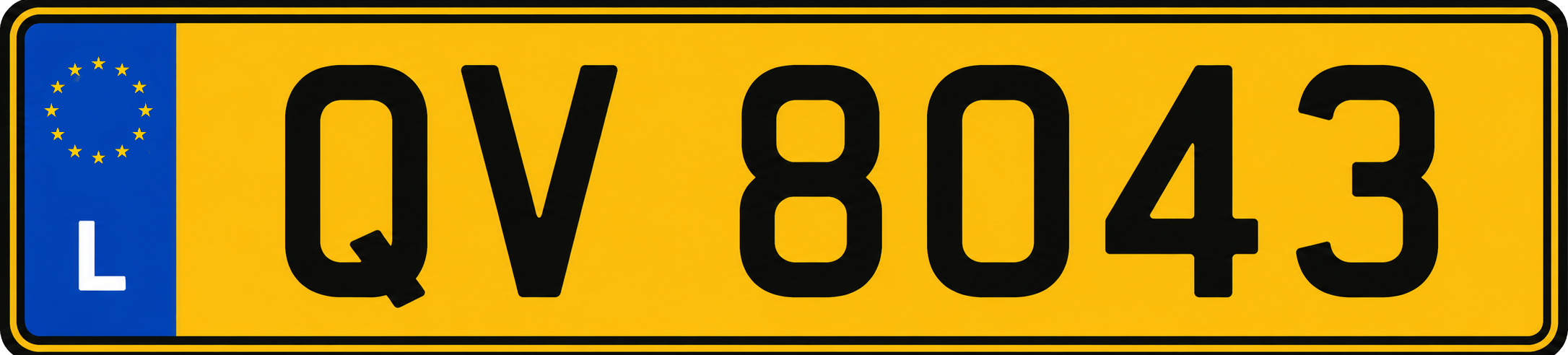
- Current regular legal standard number plate from Luxembourg.
- Country: Luxembourg
- Country code: L

Current series
- Size: 520 mm × 110 mm 20.5 in × 4.3 in
- Serial format: AB 1234 (for standard plates)
- Colour (front): Black on yellow
- Colour (rear): Black on yellow

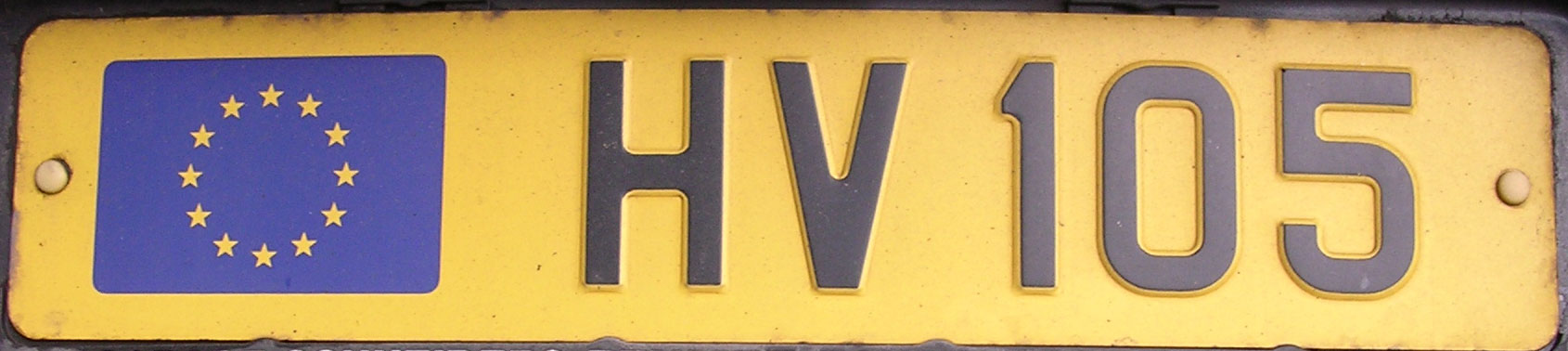
Luxembourg vehicle registration plate (older format)

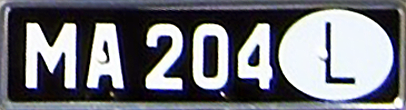
Luxembourg plate dating from 1966 to 1978, with white lettering on a black background

Vehicle registration plates in Luxembourg bear a maximum of six characters. The standard series in use today uses a format of two letters followed by four digits (e.g., XY 3456). Before adoption of the current scheme, marks consisting only of digits (comprising four, and later, five digits) and two digits and three numbers letters, were issued. The digit-only plates may only now be issued as a custom plate.

The numbers are issued at a national level and give no indication of regional origin. Plates have black characters on a yellow background, with the standard blue EU stripe on the left. The current usage and format of plates was enacted by parliament in June 2003.

== Standard plates ==
The two-letter/four-digit format follows a rather unusual scheme (see Sequence). The apparently random order of issue makes it difficult for the uninitiated to determine a car's age from its number plate. On standard plates, leading zeroes are permitted (example: XY 000n). Some letter combinations are reserved for Special Plates. The standard plate for small vehicles such as mopeds is a smaller size and comprises only two letters and two digits (example: XY nn).

== Custom plates ==
Custom plates (where the mark is chosen by the owner) conform either to the standard format or consist of four or five digits. The scarcity of four-digit numbers means that there is a waiting list for them. Obtaining a custom plate costs €200. A custom plate can be issued only for new cars or upon a change of ownership. There is no market for trading numbers privately.

== History ==
Plates originally comprised digits only. (Four- and five-digit numbers can still be issued on request, but lower numbers are withheld from private use once the car is taken off the road.)

More recently, combinations of one letter and four digits, then two letters and three digits, were introduced, but these are no longer issued and are therefore gradually disappearing. The rear number plate latterly featured a large EU flag without a country code.

A new registration number is allocated each time a car with a number in the old format changes ownership.

Plates used to have white numbers on a black background, but these have all but disappeared with the exception of classic cars, for which there is a special exemption.

== Special plates ==
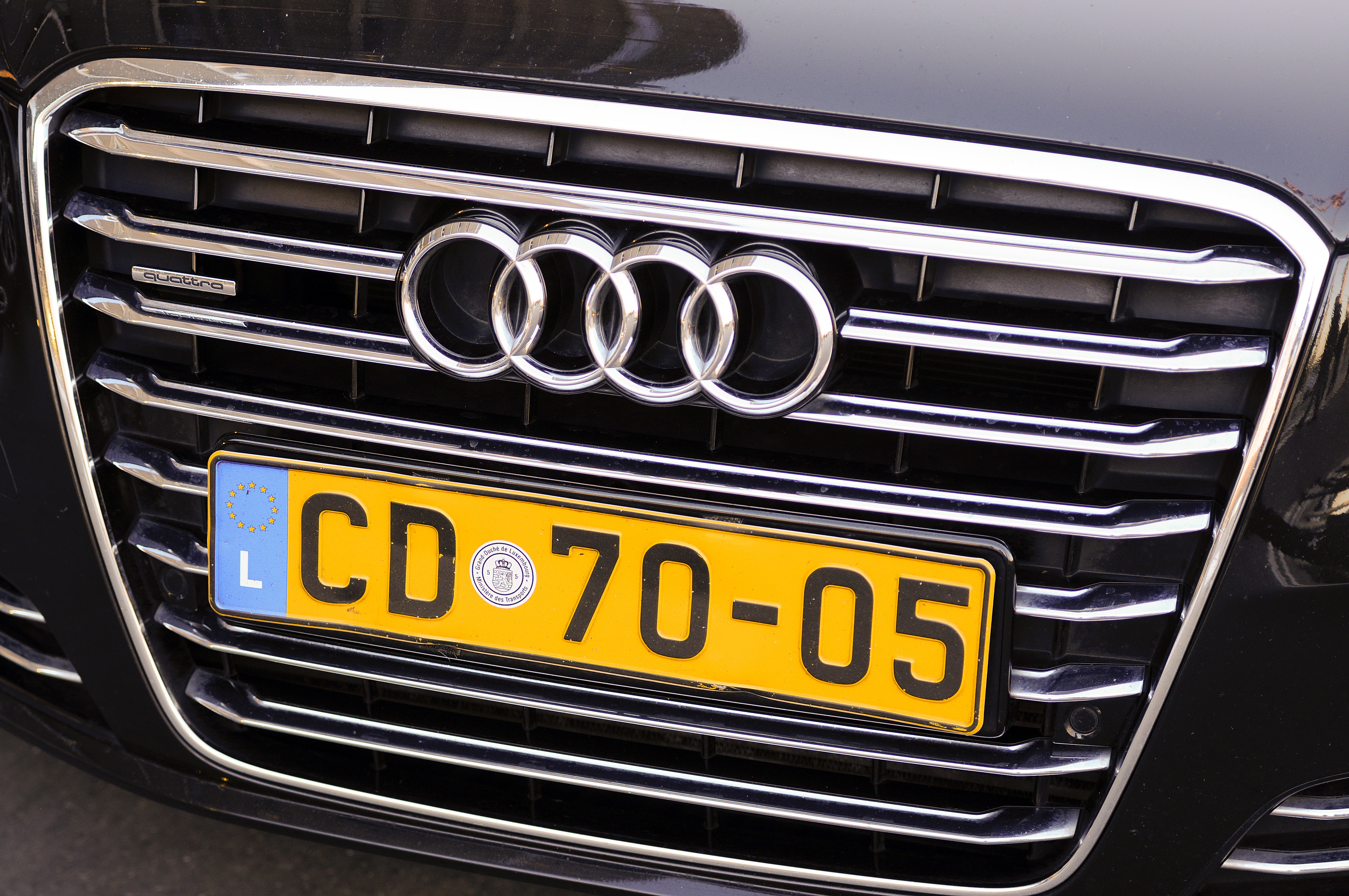
CD number

Luxembourg military license plate

- Single digits are reserved for the Grand-Ducal family, two-digit numbers for the government car fleet.
- The Chamber of Deputies has its own series (P1-P99)
- CD numbers are issued to those with relevant diplomatic status (format: CD plus two sets of two digits separated by a hyphen)
- Numbers starting with AA are reserved for official purposes (e.g. police cars) and ZZ is also reserved for special purposes.
- Temporary plates had an expiration date on left side, then numbers and letters EXP.
- Military plates are white on black and four digits. On the left side is the national coat of arms.
- Dealer plates are in digits only and issued in white on red plate.

== Sequence ==
The order followed by the standard series letters and digits is rather unusual - numbers below 4000 are reserved for custom plates: those from 4000 to 9999 are assigned in blocks of 1000 with a changing sequence of letters. The series set out by the legislation was BA4000-BA4999, CA5000-5999, DA6000-DA6999, etc. However, it would appear that the issuers of the numbers took a while to adopt this, as the CA series used 4000–4999 before DA followed with 5000 to 5999. The prescribed sequence of issue follows a pattern of ascending and descending alphabetical order of the two letters, as can be seen in the following list. When the first block of 1000 AZ numbers has been issued, we will presumably see the issue of BA5000. Note that certain letters (I and O) and combinations are excluded. The list should be read from top to bottom, left to right:

BA JJ TS XZ NR DH FA RJ YS PZ DR GH QB ZK QS
CA GJ RS YZ PR EH EB QK ZS QZ ER FH PB YK RT
DA FJ QT ZY QR FG DB PK ZT RY FQ EG NB XK ST
EA EK PT YY RQ GG CB NK YT SY GQ DG MB WK TT
FB DK NT XY SQ HG BB MK XT TY HQ CG LB VL UT
GB CK MT WY TQ JG AB LK WT UY JQ BG KC UL VT
HB BK LT VX UQ KG AC KL VU VY KQ AG JC TL WU
JB AK KU UX VQ LF BC JL UU WX LP AF HC SL XU
KB AL JU TX WP MF CC HL TU XX MP BF GC RL YU
LC BL HU SX XP NF DC GL SU YX NP CF FC QM ZU
MC CL GU RX YP PF EC FL RU ZX PP DF ED PM ZV
NC DL FU QW ZP QF FD EM QV ZW QP EF DD NM YV
PC EL EV PW ZN RE GD DM PV YW RN FE BD MM XV
QC FM DV NW YN SE HD CM NV XW SN GE AD LM WV
RD GM CV MW XN TE JD BM MV WW TN HE AE KN VW
SD HM BV LW WN UE KD AM LV VV UN JE BE JN UW
TD JM AV KV VM VE LE AN KW UV VN KE CE HN TW
UD KM AW JV UM WD ME BN JW TV WM LD DE GN SW
VD LN BW HV TM XD NE CN HW SV XM MD EE FN RW
WE MN CW GV SM YD PE DN GW RV YM ND FF EP QX
XE NN DW FV RM ZD QE EN FW QU ZM QD GF DP PX
YE PN EW EU QL ZC RF FP EX PU ZL RC HF CP NX
ZE QN FX DU PL YC SF GP DX NU YL SC JF BP MX
ZF RP GX CU NL XC TF HP CX MU XL TC KF AP LX
YF SP HX BU ML VB UF JP BX LU WL UC LG AQ KY
XF TP JX AU LL UB VF KP AX KT VK VC MG BQ JY
WF UP KX AT JK TB WG LQ AY JT UK WB NG CQ HY
VG VP LY BT HK SB XG MQ BY HT TK XB PG DQ GY
UG WQ MY CT GK RB YG NQ CY GT SK YB QG EQ FY
TG XQ NY DT FK QA ZG PQ DY FT RK ZB RH FR EZ
SG YQ PY ET EJ PA ZH QQ EY ES QJ ZA SH GR DZ
RG ZQ QY FS DJ NA YH RR FZ DS PJ YA TH HR CZ
QH ZR RZ GS CJ MA XH SR GZ CS NJ XA UH JR BZ
PH YR SZ HS BJ LA WH TR HZ BS MJ WA VH KR AZ
NH XR TZ JS AJ KA VJ UR JZ AS LJ VA WJ LS
MH WR UZ KS AH JA UJ VR LZ AR KH UA XJ MS
LH VS VZ LR BH HA TJ WS MZ BR JH TA YJ NS
KJ US WZ MR CH GA SJ XS NZ CR HH RA ZJ PS

This means that these combinations are excluded:

AA EI IB IL IV KZ OD ON OX SA WC
AI EO IC IM IW LI OE OO OY SI WI
AO FI ID IN IX LO OF OP OZ SO WO
BI FO IE IO IY MI OG OQ PD SS XI
BO GI IF IP IZ MO OH OR PI TI XO
CD GO IG IQ JI NI OI OS PO TO YI
CI HI IH IR JO NO OJ OT QI UI YO
CO HJ II IS KI OA OK OU QO UO ZI
DI HO IJ IT KK OB OL OV RI VI ZO
DO IA IK IU KO OC OM OW RO VO ZZ

Apart from I and O the following combinations are excluded:

- AA - Reserved for official purposes (e.g. police cars)
- CD - Used for diplomatic vehicles (Corps Diplomatique)
- HJ - Hitler-Jugend (Hitler Youth)
- KK - Kacke, the German abbreviation for "shit"
- KZ - Konzentrationslager, the German term for Nazi concentration camps (1933–1945)
- PD - Pédé, a French derogatory term equivalent to faggot
- SA - Sturmabteilung
- SS - Schutzstaffel
- WC - Water closet or flush toilet
- ZZ - Reserved for special purposes
