= Vehicle registration plates of the Isle of Man =

Isle of Man
- Country: Isle of Man
- Country code: GBM

Current series
- Size: 520 mm × 111 mm 20.5 in × 4.4 in

History
- First issued: 1906

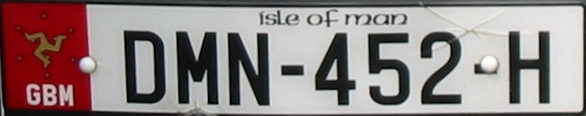
Manx car number plate

Map showing the Isle of Man within the British Isles

Vehicle registration began in the Isle of Man on 1 January 1906, following the Highways Act Amendment Act 1905.

== History ==
Initially, number plates started with the letters 'MN' followed by up to four digits. In March 1935, the prefix 'MAN' came into use, followed by up to three digits, and in April 1936 a further three-letter scheme was introduced, placing a serial letter before the 'MN' code (giving the range BMN-1 to YMN-999).

In May 1959, the scheme changed to allow the digits to precede the letters, starting with the range 1-MN to 9999-MN. This was followed in May 1964 by 1-MAN to 999-MAN, which lasted for five months, and then by 1-BMN to 999-YMN.

In November 1971, unissued numbers from the original MN-1 to MN-9999 range started to be issued. When these ran out in May 1974, a trailing letter was added, giving MAN-2-A through to MAN-999-Y. In January 1979 this was swapped to be a prefix (A-1-MAN up to Y-999-MAN), and in May 1983 the range MAN-1000 to MAN-9999 was introduced. (Note: MAN 1A was issued in the 1900s to the Lieutenant Governor's wife, thus the 1974 system commenced at MAN-2-A)

This was reversed in July 1985, giving 1000-MAN to 9999-MAN, which lasted until August 1987. At that point, the current system was introduced, which has an initial letter, followed by MN, up to three numerals, and a trailing single letter. The initial plate in this system was therefore BMN-1-A, with the registration CMN-1-A being issued following BMN-999-Y. Thus the trailing letter does not indicate the vehicle age, unlike the similar format British plates, and many different suffix letters are issued each year.

== Format ==
The letters I, Q, S and Z are not used on Manx number plates. Additionally the letter A is also not used as the initial letter and the letter O is not used as the final letter.

The Isle of Man uses retro-reflective number plates with black letters; on a white background on the front of the vehicle, and yellow on the rear. Vehicles manufactured prior to 1 February 1990 can display white-on-black plates as an alternative.

Since 23 April 2004 plates may incorporate the Manx flag, bearing the triskelion symbol surrounded by a circle of six stars, representing the 6 sheadings and the international country identification code GBM (Great Britain and Northern Ireland – (Isle of) Man).

The region code 'MN' was reserved for the Isle of Man in the original Great Britain 1903 numbering scheme, and the code 'MAN' in the 1932 GB scheme. This means that no Isle of Man registration is duplicated by a GB registration. When the current 2001 scheme was adopted in Great Britain, the region code 'MN' (within the 'M' range for Manchester and Merseyside) was reserved as well as other combinations of MN.

MN is also the format for registration plates of County Monaghan (MN) Ireland so a vehicle featuring these plates eg 171-MN-234 could possibly be seen on the island but bears no connection to the island's registration system.

The current valid list of number plate formats are:

Pool	Registration Number	Example	Years	Notes
1	MN 1 – MN 9999	MN 123	Jan 1906 → Mar 1935	
2	MAN 1 – MAN 999	MAN 123	Mar 1935 → Apr 1936	
3	xMN 1 – xMN 999	BMN 123	Apr 1936 → May 1959	Excluding x = A, I, Q, S, Z
4	1 MN – 9999 MN	1234 MN	May 1959 → May 1964	
5	1 MAN – 999 MAN	123 MAN	May 1964 → Oct 1964	
6	1 xMN – 999 xMN	123 BMN	Oct 1964 → Nov 1971	Excluding x = A, I, Q, S, Z
7	MN 1 – MN 9999	MN 1234	Nov 1971 → May 1974	unissued numbers of 1906-1935
8	MAN 1 x – MAN 999 x	MAN 123 A	May 1974 → Jan 1979	Excluding x = I, O, Q, S, Z
9	x 1 MAN – x 999 MAN	A 123 MAN	Jan 1979 → May 1983	Excluding x = I, Q, S, Z
10	MAN 1000 – MAN 9999	MAN 1234	May 1983 → Jul 1985	
11	1000 MAN – 9999 MAN	1234 MAN	Jul 1985 → Aug 1987	
12	xMN 1 y – xMN 999 y	BMN 123 A	Aug 1987 → today	Excluding x = A, I, Q, S, Z and y = I, O, Q, S, Z
13	MANX 1 – MANX 999	MANX 123	?	
14	1 MANX – 999 MANX	123 MANX	?	

There are around 65,000 registered vehicles in the Isle of Man. Number plates are produced and supplied privately, not by the government. The name of the supplying car dealer is often displayed along the bottom of the plate. Registrations can be transferred from vehicle to vehicle.

The official car of the Lieutenant Governor carries the registration number MAN-1. Registrations including the numbers 999 or 112 (for example, BMN-999-A) are used for emergency vehicles, but not exclusively.

Trade plates have red letters on a white background, and display a number prefixed by MNA.
