= Vehicle registration plates of Finland =

Finland/Suomi
- Standard Finnish plate used since 2001
- Country: Finland
- Country code: FIN

Current series
- Serial format: ABC-123 (for regular plates)
- Colour (front): Black on white
- Colour (rear): Black on white

Finnish vehicle registration plates usually carry three letters and three numbers separated with a dash (e.g. ABC-123), though vanity plates may carry 2-3 letters and 1-3 numbers. Since 1989 the code has no connection with the geographic location, except that Åland has its own type of plate. Between 1972/1973 and 1989 the first letter indicated where the vehicle was first registered as the plate did not have to be changed even if the vehicle was moved to another area of Finland.

== History ==
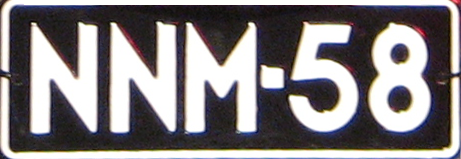
Old Finnish plate (1960–72)

- 1917–1922: Right after gaining independence, different licence plates were issued for each city.
- 1922–1929: The standard plate had a white background, on which a provincial designation and four-digit number was marked.
- 1930s–1940s: Annual plates were issued. Plates for odd-numbered years were white with black markings and plates for even-numbered years were black with white markings. The registration number consisted of a provincial designation, dash and a (maximum) four-digit number. A seal and the last two digits of the current year were marked on the left side of the plate.
- 1950: Annual plates were no longer issued. The standard registration number consisted of two letters, a dash and a (maximum) three-digit number, embossed in white on a black background. The first letter was the provincial designation.
- 1960: A white border was added to the plate. The registration number consisted of three letters, a dash and one or two numbers.
- 1972: The current licence plate type was introduced.
- 1996: The size of the vehicle licence plate was reduced. The old dimensions were 123 mm x 342 mm and 123 mm x 397 mm.
- 2001: EU licence plates were introduced.

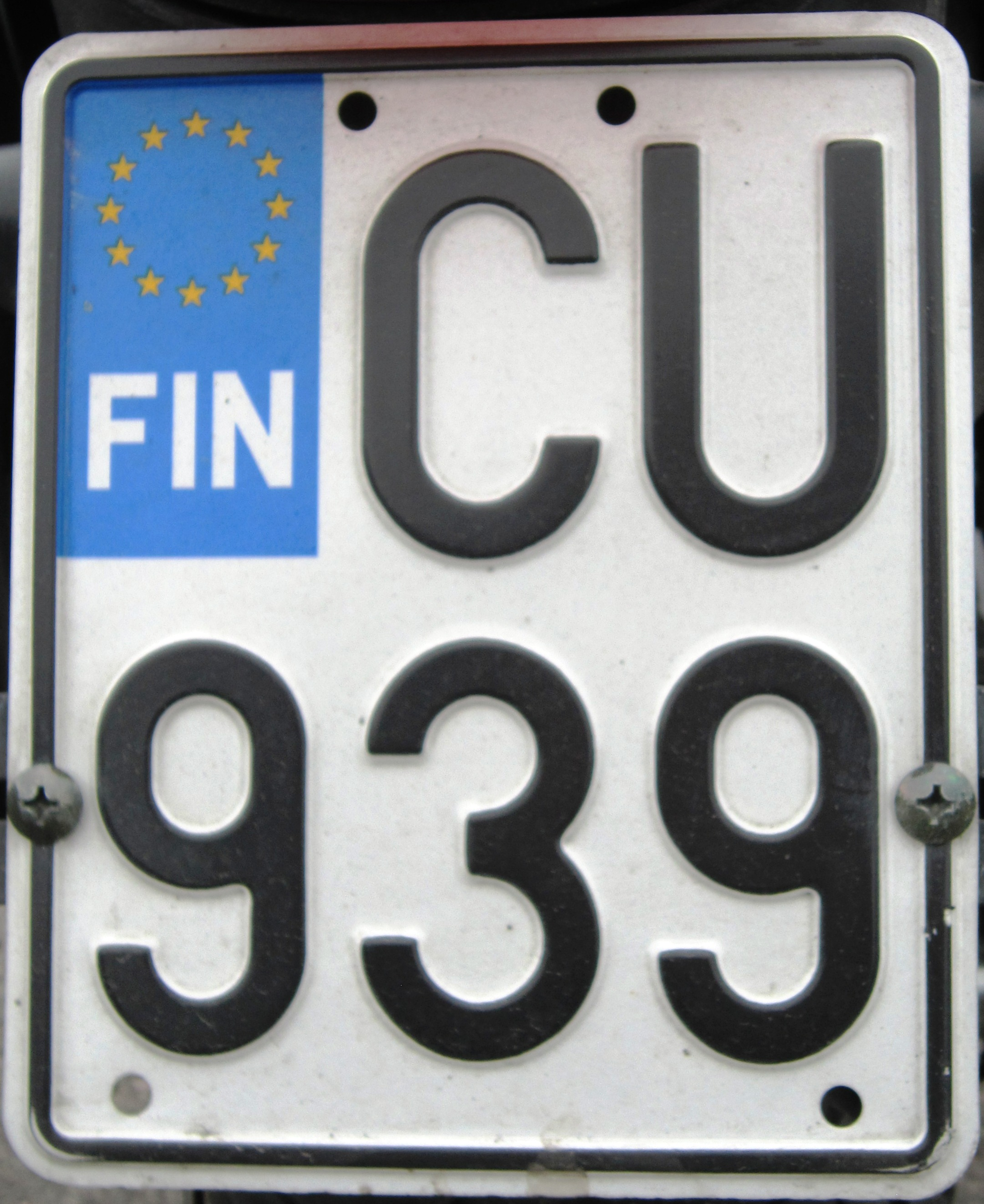
Plate for motorcycles

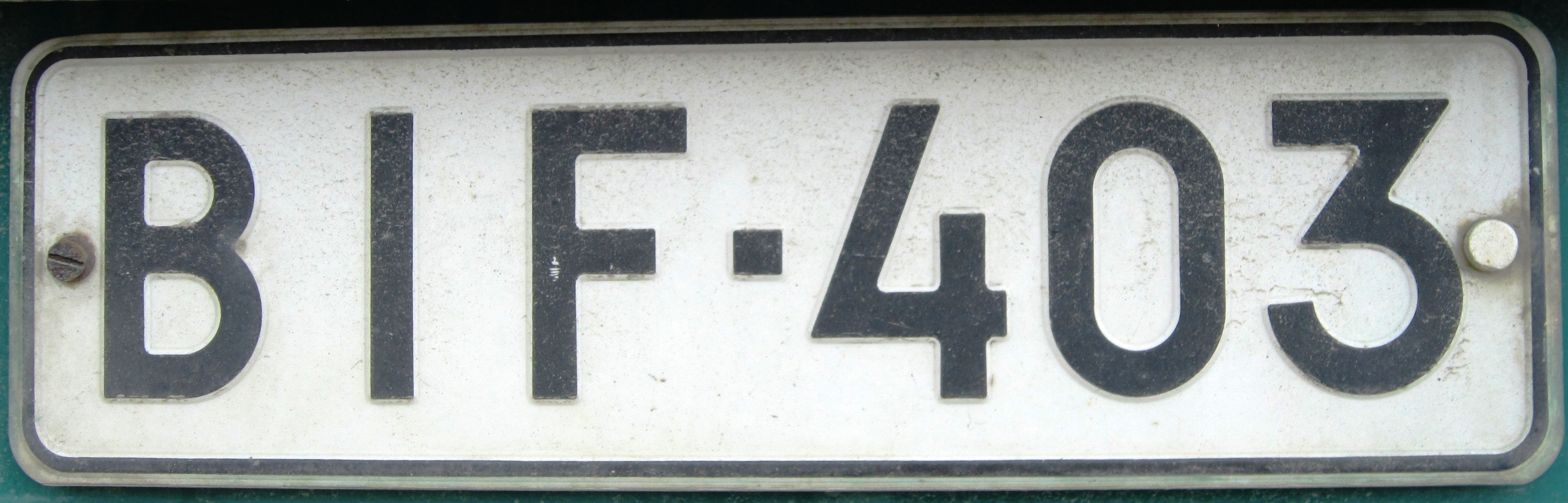
Pre-2001 licence plate

SF was the former Finnish International vehicle registration code

=== Codes (1922 to 1972) ===
- A = Helsinki city
- B = Helsinki
- C = Helsinki
- E = Turku and Pori Province
- F = Turku and Pori Province
- G = Kymi Province
- H = Häme Province
- I = Häme Province
- K = Kuopio Province
- L = Lapland Province
- M = Mikkeli Province
- N = Häme Province until 1961
- O = Oulu Province
- R = Kymi Province
- S = North Karelia Province
- T = Turku Province
- U = Uusimaa Province
- V = Vaasa Province (originally VA with four digits)
- X = Central Finland Province
- Y = Vaasa Province
- Z = Uusimaa Province
- ÅL = Åland (with four digits)

== Current ==
The registration number consists of two or three letters and a (maximum) three-digit number, embossed in black on a white, reflective field. A dash appears between the letter and number series.

Licence plate dimensions are 118 mm x 442 mm or 200 mm x 256 mm.

- Hole location/long plate: longitudinally 63.5 mm from the edge, vertically 59.0 mm from the edge (hole diameter 7 mm).
- Hole location/high plate: longitudinally 18.0 mm from the edge, vertically 100.0 mm from the edge (hole diameter 7 mm).

Old model licence plate dimensions are 118 mm x 397 mm or 118 mm x 338 mm.

- Hole location (118 mm x 397 mm): longitudinally 18.75 mm from the edge, vertically 59.6 mm from the edge (hole diameter 7 mm).
- Hole location (118 mm x 338 mm): longitudinally 16.75 mm from the edge, vertically 59.6 mm from the edge (hole diameter 7 mm).

On the vehicle designated for the President of the Republic of Finland, the licence plates can be replaced with the Finnish coat of arms.

FIN
ABC-123

=== Åland Islands ===
Åland/Ahvenanmaa
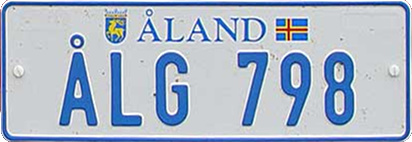
- Åland number-plate.
- Country: Åland (Finland)
- Country code: AX

Current series
- Size: 390 mm × 130 mm 15.4 in × 5.1 in
- Serial format: ÅBC 123 (for regular plates)
- Colour (front): Black on white
- Colour (rear): Black on white

An Åland number-plate has blue lettering. The official international vehicle registration code was FIN as in the rest of Finland until 13 September 2025 when it was changed to AX.

Åland
ÅL 12345

Plates from Åland always begin with ÅL. Until 2011 they were always 3 letters and 1-3 numbers like rest of Finland, but in 2011 the plates started to have ÅL and 5 digits.

=== Codes ===
Regular, non-vanity plates also have some more limitations:

- 2-3 letters & 1-3 numbers (5 in Åland)
- The letters used are A-Z and Å, Ä & Ö
- The letter part may not begin with P, W or D (used for trailers, but if you want to buy a specific plate then you can have also these letters in the beginning)
- The number part may not begin with 0

== Special plates ==
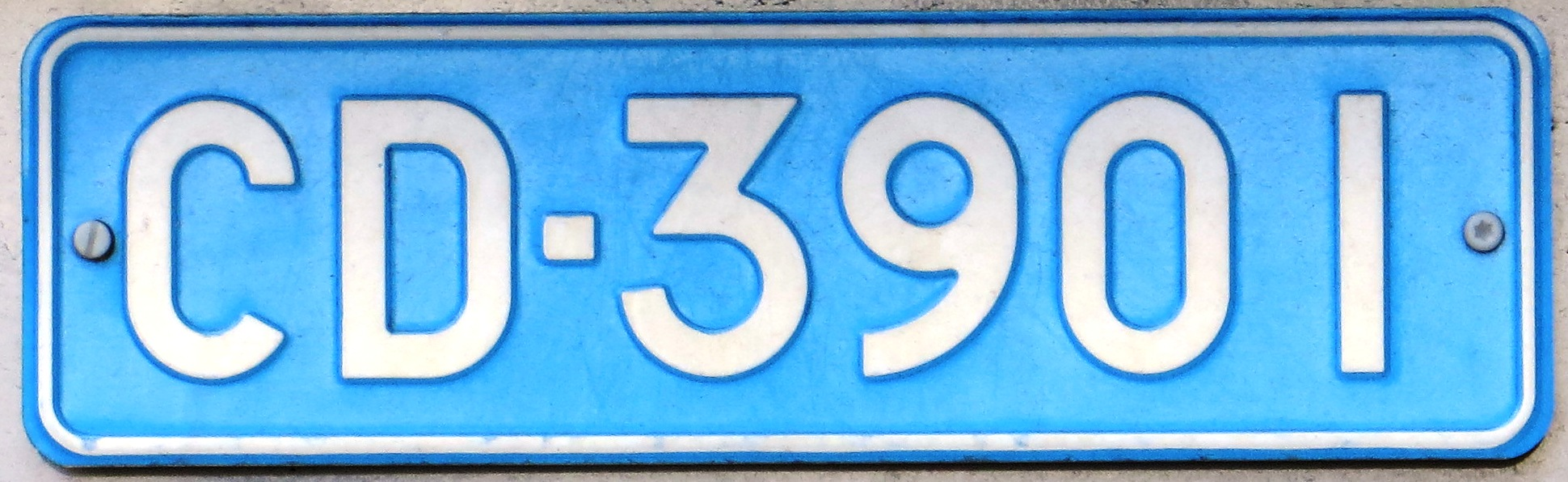
Diplomatic license plate

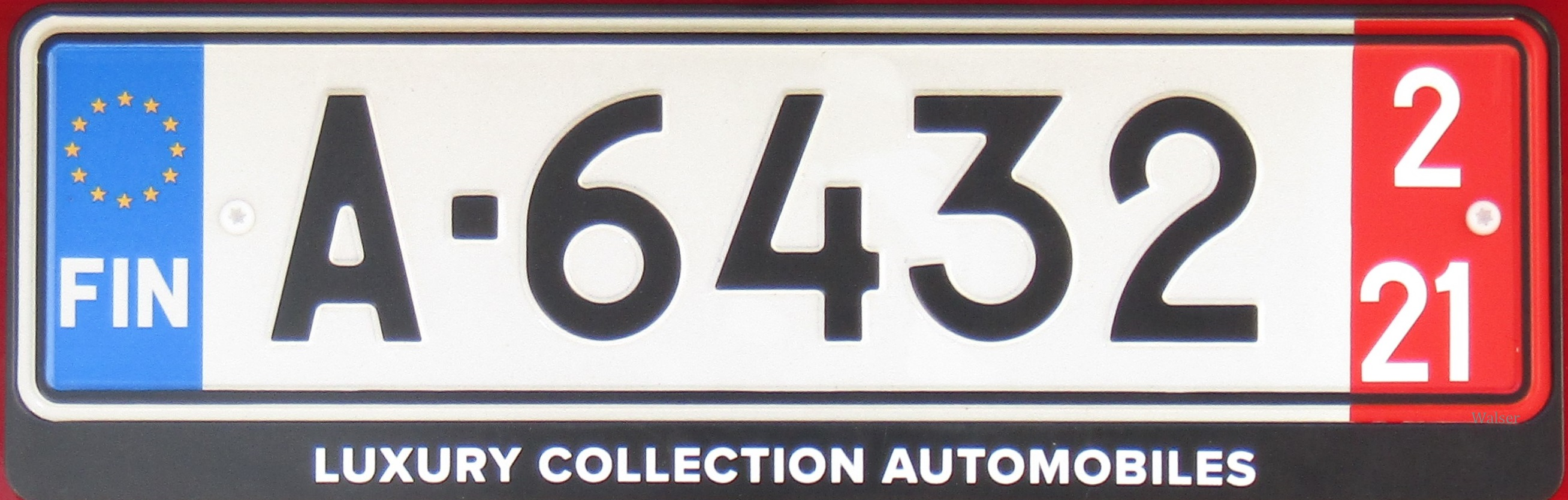
Export registration licence plate

Export registration licence plates contain one letter and a (maximum) four-digit number.

FIN
C-1234

A diplomatic number plate has a blue background and white reflective lettering. The letters are either "C" or "CD", for French Corps Diplomatique. CD plates are with maximum of four numbers and C maximum of five numbers.

CD-123

CD 3NX

C-1234

Museum registered cars have black plates which have two or three letters and maximum of three numbers with white colour. Size on the plate is 118 mm × 338 mm.

MAA-123

Museum registered motorcycles have black plates which have two letters and maximum of three numbers with white colour. Size on the plate is 119 mm x 280 mm

MR-100

Tractors and other similar work vehicles have maximum of three numbers and maximum of three letters, separated by a middot, with black on reflective yellow background.

743·GTB

Military vehicles use yellow plates with black characters similar to those of tractors. Motorised vehicles display up to five digits, and towed equipment uses one letter followed by up to four digits. Armoured vehicles display the letters "Ps" followed by a three-digit model number and a registration number separated by a hyphen, painted in white characters on a dark plate or in black on white/light-coloured vehicles.

12345

A·1234

Ps 123·45

Temporary license plates, or actually single-use stickers, are only plates in a plastic, with a red lettering. They have two letters (originally one) and maximum of four numbers. Stickers have glue stripes on both sides, so they can be attached either outside of the car or inside of rear- and windscreens. These are most commonly used during rallies.

AG-1234

Test plates have black characters on a yellow background, with the letters KOE arranged vertically on the left. Traficom issues test plate certificates to companies for the temporary use or transfer of vehicles, including unregistered vehicles and vehicles taken out of traffic use. Permitted uses must relate directly to the certificate holder's business and include testing for research and development, short test drives or demonstrations for sales purposes, and transfers connected with manufacture, sale, equipping, repair or inspection. Vehicles banned from traffic because they have not been inspected or are not roadworthy may also be moved with test plates for repair or inspection. The certificate is valid for one year from its date of issue and must be carried in the vehicle whenever it is driven with test plates.

$$\begin{matrix}
\mathsf{K} \\
\mathsf{O} \\
\mathsf{E}
\end{matrix}$$
A·599
