= European vehicle registration plate =

All EU countries issue registration plates in the common EU format. (S denotes Sverige (Sweden))

Some countries issue registration plates with a national flag or symbol. (N denotes Norway)

Some countries issue registration plates with no flag or symbol. (TR denotes Turkey)

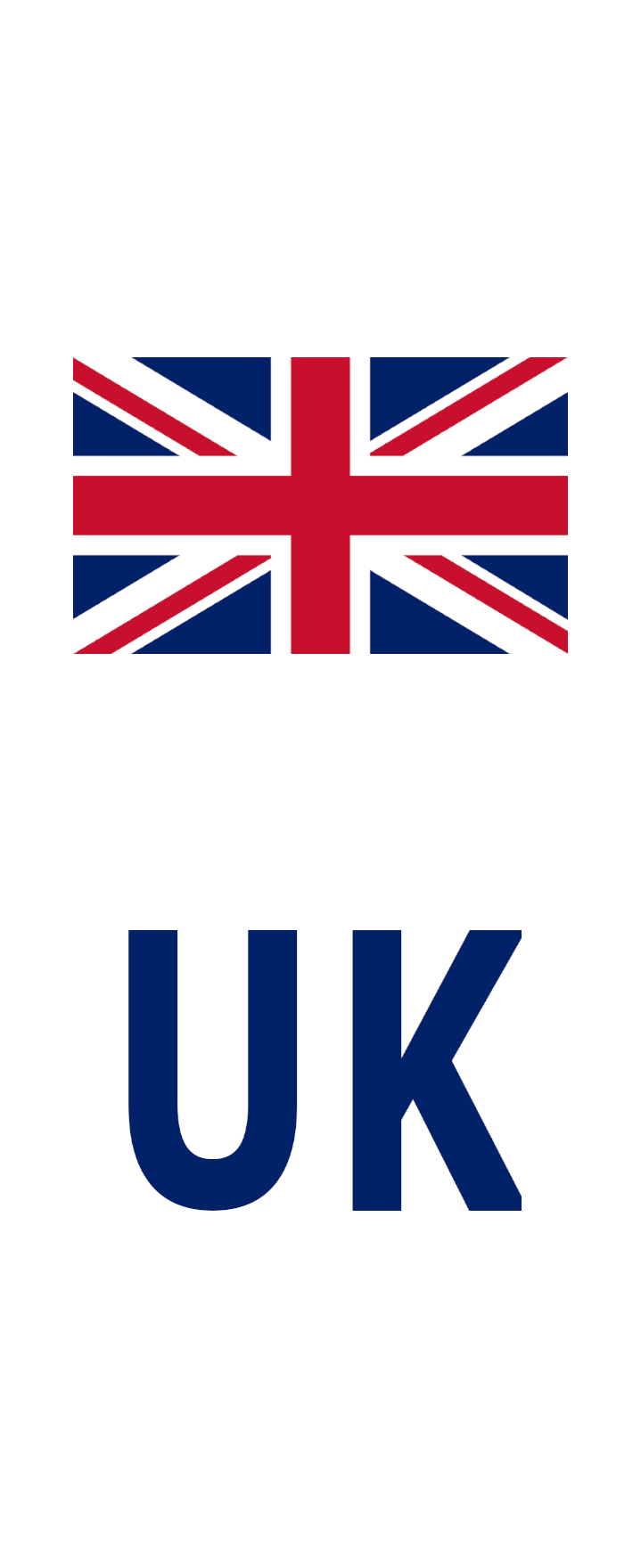
Some countries issue registration plates with a different background colour. (UK denotes United Kingdom)

All of these registration plates satisfy the requirements for vehicles in cross-border traffic set in the Vienna Convention on Road Traffic as they display the international vehicle registration code for the country of registration incorporated into the vehicle registration plate.

A vehicle registration plate (Note: Also known as a number plate (British English), license plate or licence plate (American English and Canadian English respectively).) is a metal or plastic plate or plates attached to a motor vehicle or trailer for official identification purposes. The registration identifier is a numeric or alphanumeric code that uniquely identifies the vehicle within the issuing authority's database. This article concerns these plates in territories across Europe.

Most countries in the region have adopted a format for registration plates that satisfies the requirements in the Vienna Convention on Road Traffic, which states that cross-border vehicles must display a distinguishing code for the country of registration on the rear of the vehicle. This sign may be an oval sticker placed separately from the registration plate, or may be incorporated into the plate. When the distinguishing sign is incorporated into the registration plate, it must also appear on the front plate of the vehicle, and may be supplemented with the flag or emblem of the national state, or the emblem of the regional economic integration organisation to which the country belongs. An example of such format is the common EU format, with the European flag above the country code issued in EU member states.

== Format ==
The vast majority of European countries issue registration plates that are:

- 520 by 110 mm (20.5 by 4.3 inches)
- 520 by 120 mm (20.5 by 4.7 inches)

This is one of the basic standard sizes worldwide.

The others are:

- 305 by 152 mm (12.0 by 6.0 inches), commonly issued to import vehicles from North and Central America
- 305 by 160 mm (12.0 by 6.3 inches)
- 372 by 135 mm (14.6 by 5.3 inches)

Some European countries use registration plates in other formats:

- 330 by 140 mm (13.0 by 5.5 inches) in Andorra
- 440 by 120 mm (17.3 by 4.7 inches) in Finland
- 260 by 110 mm (10.2 by 4.3 inches) in Monaco
- 390 by 120 mm (15.4 by 4.7 inches) in San Marino
- 300 by 80 mm (11.8 by 3.1 inches) in Switzerland and Liechtenstein (only front plates)
- 360 by 110 mm (14.2 by 4.3 inches) in Italy (only front plates)
- 390 by 130 mm (15.4 by 5.1 inches) and 345 by 130 mm (13.6 by 5.1 inches) in Åland

=== European Union ===
The common EU format of having a blue section on the extreme left with EU circle of stars and the country code was introduced by Council Regulation (EC) No 2411/98 of 3 November 1998 and entered into force on 11 November 1998. It was based on a model registration plate which three member states had already introduced: Ireland (1991), Portugal (1992) and Germany (1994). Luxembourg plates had displayed the EU flag on the left since 1988. Vehicles with registration plates in the EU format do not need to display the white oval international vehicle registration code while within the European Economic Area, or in countries party to the Vienna Convention on Road Traffic (except if the plate is issued in Cyprus, Ireland, Malta and Spain, which are not party to the convention).

- The common design consists of a blue strip on the left side of the plate. This blue strip has the EU flag symbol (twelve yellow stars), along with the country code of the member state in which the vehicle is registered. All EU countries now issue plates in the common format, but the use of the EU flag on registration plates is optional for member states.
- EU member states that require foreign vehicles to display a distinguishing sign of the country of origin are obliged by Article 3 of EC 2411/98 to accept the standard design as a distinguishing sign when displayed on a vehicle registered in another member state. The requirement to display a distinguishing sign stems from the Vienna Convention on Road Traffic, and the regulation is referencing the recognition of distinguishing signs according to that convention.
- EU format plates are either white or yellow, on a plate wider than it is tall. Yellow registration plates are used both front and rear in Luxembourg and the Netherlands. Denmark and Hungary use yellow plates for vehicles registered as commercial vehicles. Denmark implemented the EU format in 2009, as the last EU country. Danish plates have a small holographic strip to the right of the blue EU strip. In Greece, Cyprus, Latvia, Lithuania and Sweden yellow plates are used for taxi vehicles. In Poland yellow plates are used for historic vehicles.
- Belgium uses red characters and is the only country not to use the standard black-on-white or black-on-yellow combination; with the introduction of European-style plates in November 2010, a slightly darker shade of red was chosen (RAL 3003) to improve legibility.
- Of those states that joined in the 2004 enlargement of the European Union Malta already used EU format plates, while Latvia, Poland and Lithuania had used plates displaying the national flag before their accession, as did Bulgaria and Romania before their accession in 2007.
- Most European countries use metal plates but France and Ireland use a mixture of flat plastic and metal plates. Flat plastic plates also used to be used in Sweden.
- The plate must be at +/-5° to the longitudinal plane of the vehicle. Lower edge must be higher than 0.3m and upper edge lower than 1.2m.

=== Other countries ===
Several non-EU European states have implemented formats similar to the EU format, with national flags or symbols, plus the country code. Vehicles with such registration plates, issued in countries party to the Vienna Convention on Road Traffic, do not need to display the white oval international vehicle registration code while within countries signatory to the Vienna Convention on Road Traffic.

- Norway is an example of such a state, issuing registration plates with the country code (N) Norwegian flag replacing the circle of stars. In Norway, regular plates are white with black characters; however, cars with front seats only (used for carrying goods) have green plates with black characters. Norwegian registration plates are made of metal, but flat plastic has also been used for earlier plates. Ukraine issues plates similar to the Norwegian ones, with the Ukrainian flag above the country code (UA). Moldovan registration plates have a wider than usual blue band with the Moldovan flag and the international country code (MD). Albanian registration plates are also similar to those of Norway and Ukraine, but they have the coat of arms of Albania above the country code (AL).
- Bosnia and Herzegovina (BIH) issues plates with a blue strip on the left side of the plate with the country code, but without the any flag or symbol. The same design is used on registration plates in Turkey (TR) (which is in a customs union with the EU), Montenegro (MNE), North Macedonia (NMK) and Serbia (SRB).
- Belarus issues registration plates with the national flag above the country code on the left side, but without the blue strip. Iceland issues plates similar to the Belarusian plates, with the Icelandic flag above the country code IS on the left side. Iceland, however, is not party to the Vienna Convention on Road Traffic.
- Andorra and Monaco use registration plates with their coat of arms above the respective country codes (AND and MC). San Marino issues similar plates but with the text "Repubblica di San Marino" underneath the coat of arms, instead of the country code RSM.
- United Kingdom vehicles must have a white front registration plate and a yellow rear registration plate. These must be made from a reflective material, commonly plastic but metal is permitted. Post-2021 Regulations (Following Brexit): On 28 September 2021, the UK government changed the international vehicle code from "GB" to "UK" and notified the United Nations of this update, effectively making all "GB" plates with the European circle of stars invalid for use abroad. Since 2021, plates with the European circle of stars must not be issued. Plates valid for international travel under the Vienna Convention on Road Traffic must feature either the distinguishing code "UK" (in black or blue) or the Union Flag (landscape) alongside "UK." A green stripe on left-hand side of the plate is permissible for a zero-emission vehicle. In England, Scotland, and Wales, registration plates may include one of the following flags with identifying letters on the left-hand side:
  - The English flag may be accompanied by "ENG," "Eng," "ENGLAND," or "England."
  - The Scottish flag may be accompanied by "SCO," "Sco," "SCOTLAND," or "Scotland."
  - The Welsh flag may be accompanied by "CYM," "Cym," "CYMRU," "Cymru," "WALES," or "Wales."
  - The Union Flag may be displayed with "GB," "GREAT BRITAIN," "Great Britain," "UK," "UNITED KINGDOM," or "United Kingdom."
    If a national flag is displayed, a "UK" sticker must be affixed to the rear when driving abroad. Motorists in Northern Ireland are not permitted to display the letters "NI" alongside any flag. Only the Union Flag with the "UK" code is optionally allowed.
  - Gibraltar uses plates similar to the EU format, but without a flag or symbol, only the code GBZ. They used the EU flag before Brexit. As in the UK, yellow plates at the rear and white at the front.
  - The Crown dependencies of Guernsey, including Alderney and Jersey and the Isle of Man have registration plates that are different from those used in the UK. Guernsey plates sometimes contain the letters GBG below the Guernsey flag on the left side, Alderney plates may have GBA below an Alderney flag. Jersey registration plates may incorporate the coat of arms of Jersey in a white strip on the left, along with the country identifier GBJ, and since 2004 Manx plates may incorporate the Manx flag and the international country identification code GBM.

=== Common letter and digit systems between countries ===
Several countries have made efforts to avoid duplicating registration numbers used by other countries. This is not completely successful and there are occasional difficulties in connection with parking fines and automatic speed cameras.

- Cyprus (from 90s), Finland, Lithuania, Malta, and Moldova (since 2014) each use combinations of first three letters and then three digits, AAA 000. The same format was used in Belgium (until 2010), Hungary (until 2022), Georgia (until 2015), and Sweden (until 2019, now AAA 00A).
- Bulgaria uses plate numbers in the form A[A] 0000 AA, i.e. one or two letters representing the region, then four digits, then two more letters. All letters used are intersection of Latin and Cyrillic alphabet, i.e. A, B, C, E, H, K, M, O, P, T, X and Y. The same format is in use in Ukraine since 2004; it was also used in France until 2009 and in Spain until 2000 (but still valid, called "sistema provincial").
- Estonia uses a combination of three digits followed by three letters, in the format 000 AAA. Spain uses a similar four number-three letter combination, in the form of 0000 BBB (vowels and some possibly confusing consonants, like Ñ and Q, are not used)
- Italy (since 1994), France (since 2009), Albania and Slovakia (since 2023) use a combination of three digits and four letters, in the format AA 000 AA (French plates also include hyphens), while Hungary uses a similar format (AA AA-000) since 2022.
- Greece uses a combination of three letters (before only two) that are homoglyphs of Latin letters, i.e. A, B, E, Z, H, I, K, M, N, O, P, T, Y, X in Greek alphabetic order) and four digits, in the form of AAA-0000, while Latvia uses a similar format with two letters and four digits (AA-0000).
- Denmark and Norway use two letters and five digits (AB 12345), while trailers use two letters and four digits. The plates look very similar, but Denmark has a red border around the plate. Use of the country code on the plate may mitigate this problem (Norway began using the system on 1 November 2006). Denmark has begun running out of combinations in this style and has now introduced combinations previously reserved for the Faroe Islands for EU style registration plates (which will use different letters from non-EU style plates). Liechtenstein and Vatican City use the same format, but with fixed letter combinations — FL (Fürstentum Liechtenstein) and CV (Città del Vaticano). Liechtenstein is also the only country in Europe to issue standard registration plates with a black background and white characters.
- The Netherlands (until 2008) and Portugal both use three groups of two characters (letters or numbers) in several sequences: AB-12-CD, 12-34-AB, 12-AB-34, AB-12-34, etc. However, Portuguese plates since 90s have a white background, while those of Netherlands (after 1 January 1978) have a yellow one, though both countries also use white letters on blue plates for classic cars. Furthermore, newer plates on Dutch vehicles only contain consonants, to avoid coincidental abbreviations or words. Also some sensitive letter combinations, such as SS or SD, are not used. The combination 'AA' is reserved for cars of the royal family. Dutch company registered bus, truck and/or minivan plates always start with a B or a V. Dutch taxis use blue registration plates. The number of new combinations ran out in 2008. New registered cars in the Netherlands now use the format of three letters-two digits-one letter (ABC-12-D).
- Belgium used the sequence ABC-123 between 1973 and 2008. When these combinations ran out in 2008, the inverse sequence 123-ABC was adopted, with the first plate in the new series issued on 25 June 2008. With the introduction of the EU format registration plates on 15 November 2010, a seven-character combination 1-ABC-234 is used and the previous 123-ABC was discontinued. However, the six-character plates will remain valid, and no date is set for their expiration. Since Belgian plates are linked to an owner rather than to a vehicle, these older plates are likely to remain in use for a considerable time. As a way to phase out the six-character plates, future vehicle subscriptions will only be possible on the seven-character plates. Private numbers, not following any notation, are also allowed.
- Luxembourg standard registration plates use two letters and four digits, similar to those of Latvia (AB 1234). Plates with 5 digits (12345) and 4 digits (1234) are also issued upon request. Older series with two letters and three digits (AB 123), and one letter and 4 digits (A 1234) are no longer issued but are still in use. Special plates for diplomats, the government, the grand-ducal family, military vehicles and temporary registrations exist and follow specific rules. Two letters and three digits (AB 123) is also used in Northern Cyprus, and until 1973 it was used on the entire island of Cyprus.
- Current registrations allocated in Romania and the United Kingdom (where the registration contains two digits) are both of the form AB 12 CDE. The Romanian rear plates are white whereas UK ones are yellow. There is also a difference in the spacing and the font. In 2010, Bucharest, the capital of Romania, adopted the form B 123 AAA, three digits and three letters, because the number of cars had risen. In the United Kingdom, B 123 AAA was issued to cars registered from August 1984 to August 1985. Aside from this, some county codes can clash (MH, in Romania it stands for Mehedinți, and in the United Kingdom, it stands for Manchester).
- Until 1973/74 the Swedish pattern was one letter representing the län (county) where the car was first registered, followed by four or five digits. However, in the more populated län, a second letter was introduced over time. For example, vehicles from southernmost county got the letter M + five digits, later also MA + five digits, MB + five digits etc. A problem was that the two northernmost counties had already been given two letters, the letter prefixes AC and BD, as the number of counties exceeded the number of usable letters. This system gave similar numbers as Denmark and Norway. The ABC 123 system was introduced gradually from July 1973 until June 1974. All vehicles had to switch plates, the old were not permitted after this.
- Serbia, Slovenia and Croatia use MM 000-AA, where MM stands for a city or a municipality. Additionally, Croatia and Serbia issue plates with four digits (MM 0000-AA) in large cities such as Zagreb and Belgrade, while Croatia also uses MM 0000-A. Besides the first format, Slovenia also issues: MM 00-AAA, MM A0-00A and MM AA-000. Serbia and Croatia use the national coat of arms after the municipality code, while Slovenia uses the coats of arms of individual districts (administrative units). Austria uses a reverse format of the Slovene license plates where MM stands for a district, while the coats of arms indicate a federal state. Croatia uses only Croatian Latin letters without diacritics, (except for city codes, like ČK for Čakovec), while Serbia uses Latin characters for municipality codes and dubs Cyrillic characters in a smaller font. Slovakia also used this format until 2023, while Montenegro uses a reverse format, MM AA 000
- Montenegro and Serbia, not members of the EU, used the following: MM 12-34, MM 123-45 or MM 123-456 (MM being two letter abbreviation of municipality), and having state flag (of former Yugoslavia, later Serbia and Montenegro) between municipality and numbers. Montenegro left that system in 2007, and introduced new format: MM AB 123 with Montenegrin coat of arms in circular shape between municipality and letter sequence. Blue strip with MNE country code is placed in the left side, with vacant place for EU stars, in case of joining the Union. Serbia also uses new system since 2011, with blue strip country code SRB: MM 123-AB and BG 1234-AB, with Serbian coat of arms between municipality and number sequence. The first two letters on the Serbian plates represent the municipality code, written in Latin letters, and repeated in Cyrillic characters with small letters under the coat of arms. The following system is used for taxi vehicles: MM 123 TX, NS 1234 TX and BG 12345 TX, where a TX combination is reserved for this purpose only (another taxi vehicles have private vehicle plates). Since 2017, Serbia stopped issuing plates with last two letters containing W, Q, Y, X (except TX), Č, Ć, Š, Ž, and Đ, however Serbian Latin letters with diacritics are still used to mark the municipality code, like ČA for Čačak or ŠA for Šabac.
- Poland and the United Kingdom have both used AAA 123A. In Poland these were issued from 1976 to 2000, in the UK, they were issued from 1963 to 1983, with those issued prior to 1973 being the same colour as their Polish counterparts (white on black). While in United Kingdom black plates are still valid, Polish black registration plates remain valid unless the vehicle bearing such license plates changes ownership. In Poland, this format was applied to state-owned vehicles until 1991 (vehicles owned by private parties had license plates with the AAA 1234 format), and it was eventually also applied to other vehicles until 2000.

=== Differing numbering systems ===
Individual European countries use differing numbering schemes and text fonts:

- Most countries, including Austria, Bulgaria, Croatia, the Czech Republic, Germany, Greece, Ireland, Montenegro, North Macedonia, Norway, Poland, Romania, Serbia, Slovenia and Switzerland (formerly also Sweden until 1974, Italy until 1994, Bosnia and Herzegovina until 1998, Spain until 2000, Estonia and Lithuania until 2004, Albania until 2011 and Slovakia until 2023, also former countries East Germany until 1990, Soviet Union until 1991, Czechoslovakia until 1993, Yugoslavia until 1998 and Serbia and Montenegro until 2011), have systems in which there is a direct link between a letter or letters appearing on the plate and the town or district where the plate was issued (e.g. "B" and "M" in Germany for Berlin and Munich, "BG" and "KG" in Serbia for Belgrade and Kragujevac and "AX" and "KY" in Greece for Achaea and Corfu). Some countries, including Austria, Germany, Slovenia, and Switzerland, even include a regional or municipal coat of arms on the plate, but Croatia, Montenegro, Serbia and Lithuania (from November 2023) include a national coat of arms. In Ireland, all registration plates have the name of the county of registration in Irish in smaller letters on the top.
- France (until 2009), and Turkey and Russia (since October 2013) use a system with an indirect number relation to the car's place of registration. Formerly in France, the last two characters on a plate comprised the departmental code of registration. This pattern was discontinued, but in response to popular outcry, France added a second colour bar, on the right edge of the plate, where the departmental code (no longer a part of the registration number) appears. The Turkish system has since (around early 2018) been overridden by most provinces giving out three letter-three number codes (99 XXX 000) in alphabetical order, regardless of province subdivisions.
- The United Kingdom uses a system based on the region where the car was first registered and the date of registration, for example CA52 GJK, where the "C" stands for Wales (the name of that country in Welsh being Cymru), the "A" stands for Cardiff (the letters A-O assigned to the city), and the "52" means that the car was registered in the period September 2002 to February 2003.
- Belgium, Bosnia and Herzegovina, Denmark, Iceland, Estonia (after 2004), Finland, Hungary, Latvia, Lithuania (after 2004), Luxembourg, the Netherlands, Portugal, Slovakia (after 2023) and Sweden (after 1974) use plates that do not denote the location where the car is registered. Since 2000 Spain no longer uses province codes on plates but codes like 'B' for Barcelona or 'M' for Madrid can still be seen, for cars registered before that date. Italy, also, did not use the province codes on plates between 1994 and 1999.
- Italy, since 1999, has added a blue strip on either side. On the right one are the two digits of the year when the plate was issued (e.g. "99", "05", "08") and below that there may be an optional two-letter code for the province, such as "MO" for the Province of Modena. Albania and France have adopted similar formats.
- Portuguese registration plates since late 1998 have a yellow strip on the right side, with one number at the top and another at the bottom separated by a line, respectively the year and month of the vehicle's registration. This strip was discontinued for the new registration plates issued since March 2020.
- Irish registration plates also contain the year in which the vehicle was registered. A car registered in 2008 would have the format 08-XX-XXXX. In 2013, this was updated to specify which half of the year the registration occurred. So from January to June, the registration plate would show (for 2018) 181-XX-XXXX, whereas from July to December, the plate instead shows 182-XX-XXXX.
- Turkish registration plates consist of letters and digits in combinations of 99 AB 999, 99 A 9999, 99 ABC 99, 99 AB 9999 or 99 A 99999 where the first two digits show which province the vehicle is registered from. First two digits numbers go from 01 to 81 (as there are 81 provinces in Turkey) and each one is assigned to a province with alphabetical order e.g. 01 is the code of the province Adana or 34 is the code of the province Istanbul. All 81 provinces used to use "01 AB 123" style plates initially until all combinations ran out, then the province starts to use 01 A 1234 then 01 ABC 12 etc. As a result, three largest provinces i.e. Istanbul, Ankara and İzmir are currently issuing 99 ABC 999 style plates. 99 A 99999 series are not regular since they are only used in provinces where commercial vehicles are abundant e.g. Bursa to distinguish these vehicles there from passenger cars. Letters "I" and "O" are only used in the middle 01 ABC 12 series e.g. 34 YOC 34 or 06 TIL 56 to avoid confusion with numerals "1" and "0" respectively. As an exception to this rule, there is a "HO" series that is only granted to privately operated city buses (halk otobüsleri in Turkish). Also some letters combinations like "PKK" are not issued due to their referring to political organisations or words likely to cause offence.

=== Electric vehicles ===
Several European countries have introduced special registration plates for electric vehicles, such as Hungary and Poland which issue plates with a green background; Germany which adds an E identifier to standard plates; Ireland which has introduced a green stripe to the right-hand side of registration plates; Romania which uses green lettering; Norway uses EL, EK, EV, EB, EC, ED, EE, EF, EH, EJ, EN, EP or ER as the first two letters on registration plates; Czech Republic, which uses EL as the first two letters; Bulgaria which uses EA and green lettering. Since late 2015 Latvia uses registration plates with blue lettering on white background to identify zero-emission (fully electric or hydrogen-electric hybrid) vehicles. In the United Kingdom vehicles with a Zero Emission value are allowed to display a green band on the left hand side of the plate, where the country identifier would usually sit. This is optional, and may be blank, or combined with the existing national flag options. Other countries such as the Netherlands and Sweden make no special distinctions for electric vehicles.

== Cross-border traffic ==
According to the Vienna Convention on Road Traffic, vehicles in cross-border traffic are obliged to display a distinguishing sign of the country of registration on the rear of the vehicle. This sign may either be placed separately from the registration plate or, after the convention was amended in 2006, may be incorporated into the vehicle registration plate. One of the main benefits of the convention for motorists is the obligation on signatory countries to recognise the legality of vehicles from other signatory countries. The following requirements must be met when driving outside the country of registration:

- The physical requirements for the separate sign are defined in Annex 3 of the Vienna Convention on Road Traffic, which states that the letters shall be in black on a white background having the shape of an ellipse with the major axis horizontal. The distinguishing sign should not be affixed in such a way that it could be confused with the registration number or impair its legibility.
- When the distinguishing sign is incorporated into the registration plate, it must also appear on the front registration plate of the vehicle, and may be supplemented with the flag or emblem of the national state, or the emblem of the regional economic integration organisation to which the country belongs. The distinguishing sign should be displayed on the far left or far right on the registration plate. When a symbol/flag/emblem is also displayed, the distinguishing sign shall obligatory be placed on the far left on the plate. The distinguishing sign shall be positioned so to be easy identifiable and so that it cannot be confused with the registration number or impair its legibility. The distinguishing sign shall therefore be at least a different colour from the registration number, or have a different background colour to that reserved for the registration number, or be clearly separated from the registration number, preferably with a line.

The common EU format of having a blue section on the extreme left with EU circle of stars and the country code was introduced by Council Regulation (EC) No 2411/98 of 3 November 1998 and entered into force on 11 November 1998. According to Article 3 of the regulation shall member states that require vehicles registered in another member state to display a distinguishing registration sign also recognise distinguishing signs issued in accordance with the regulation (the common EU format). After the amendment of the Vienna Convention on Road Traffic in 2006, registration plates issued in the common EU format also satisfies the requirements of the named convention and hence is also valid in all countries party to the Vienna Convention on Road Traffic (if the issuing country is party to the convention). Many other territories outside the EU have also adopted such a format.

Mopeds are exempt, and do not need to wear a distinguishing sign. If their country does not require a license plate, then the vehicle can cross borders without a license plate as well. Example: Swedish moped class II or the German insurance plate, which isn't an official license plate and only shows that insurance has been paid.

After Brexit the European Commission confirmed that British cars with registration plates with the distinguishing sign incorporated do not need a separate sign when driving in EU countries party to the Vienna Convention on Road Traffic. If the registration plate does not include the distinguishing sign, or if the vehicle is driven in an EU country not party to the Vienna Convention, a separate sign has to be displayed at the rear of the vehicle. All EU countries except Cyprus, Ireland, Malta and Spain are party to the convention.

The following European countries are required to recognise the registration plate of other European countries, satisfying the requirements set out in the Vienna Convention on Road Traffic, as an international vehicle registration code
	Registration plate in the common EU format issued in EU countries signatory to the Vienna Convention on Road Traffic: Austria; Belgium; Bulgaria; Croatia; Czech Republic; Denmark; Estonia; Finland; France; Germany; Greece; Hungary; Italy; Latvia; Lithuania; Luxembourg; Netherlands; Poland; Portugal; Romania; Slovakia; Slovenia; Sweden	Registration plate in the common EU format issued in EU countries not signatory to the Vienna Convention on Road Traffic: Cyprus; Ireland; Malta; Spain	Registration plates issued in European countries signatory to the Vienna Convention on Road Traffic: Albania; Armenia; Austria; Azerbaijan; Belarus; Belgium; Bosnia and Herzegovina; Bulgaria; Croatia; Czech Republic; Denmark; Estonia; Finland; France; Georgia; Germany; Greece; Hungary; Italy; Kazakhstan; Latvia; Liechtenstein; Lithuania; Luxembourg; Moldova; Monaco; Montenegro; Netherlands; North Macedonia; Norway; Poland; Portugal; Romania; Russia; San Marino; Serbia; Slovakia; Slovenia; Sweden; Switzerland; Turkey; Ukraine; United Kingdom
Member states of the European Economic Area (EEA): Austria; Belgium; Bulgaria; Croatia; Cyprus; Czech Republic; Denmark; Estonia; Finland; France; Germany; Greece; Hungary; Iceland; Ireland; Italy; Latvia; Liechtenstein; Lithuania; Luxembourg; Malta; Netherlands; Norway; Poland; Portugal; Romania; Slovakia; Slovenia; Spain; Sweden	Yes	Yes	No
Countries signatory to the Vienna Convention on Road Traffic: Albania; Armenia; Austria; Azerbaijan; Belarus; Belgium; Bosnia and Herzegovina; Bulgaria; Croatia; Czech Republic; Denmark; Estonia; Finland; France; Georgia; Germany; Greece; Hungary; Italy; Kazakhstan; Latvia; Liechtenstein; Lithuania; Luxembourg; Moldova; Monaco; Montenegro; Netherlands; North Macedonia; Norway; Poland; Portugal; Romania; Russia; San Marino; Serbia; Slovakia; Slovenia; Sweden; Switzerland; Turkey; Ukraine; United Kingdom	Yes	No	Yes

Some European countries are not party to the Vienna Convention on Road Traffic. Cyprus, Ireland, Malta and Spain are examples of non-signatory countries. Those who have not ratified the convention may be parties to the older 1949 Geneva Convention on Road Traffic, which is the case of the aforementioned countries. According to the Geneva convention, a distinguishing sign of the country of registration must be displayed on the rear of the vehicle. This sign must be placed separately from the registration plate and may not be incorporated into the vehicle registration plate. The letters shall be in black on a white background having the shape of an ellipse with the major axis horizontal.

== List ==
Vehicle registration plates of each country are described in the following table:

Motorcycle plates are used for motorcycles and vehicles where mounting space is an issue such as vehicles imported from countries where the mounting space was not originally designed to take European-sized plates (e.g. USA).

Moped plates are used for 2-wheeled moped and, in the European Union and EER countries for 4-wheeled mopeds (light quadricycle)

The country code has a link to an article about plates from that specific country.

=== Countries ===
Country	Code	Strip	Example	Motorcycle plates	Moped
Albania	AL				
Andorra	AND				
Austria	A				
Belarus	BY				
Belgium	B				
Bosnia and Herzegovina	BIH				
Bulgaria	BG				
Croatia	HR				
Cyprus	CY				
Czech Republic	CZ				
Denmark	DK				
Estonia	EST				
Finland	FIN				
France	F				
Germany	D				
Greece	GR				
Hungary	H				
Iceland	IS				
Ireland	IRL				
Italy	I				
Latvia	LV				
Liechtenstein	FL				
Lithuania	LT				
Luxembourg	L				
Malta	M				
Moldova	MD				
Monaco	MC				
Montenegro	MNE				
Netherlands	NL				
North Macedonia	NMK (Note: Prior to February 2019, North Macedonia used the distinguishing sign "MK".)				
Norway	N				
Poland	PL				
Portugal	P				
Romania	RO				
San Marino	RSM				
Serbia	SRB				
Slovakia	SK				
Slovenia	SLO				
Spain	E				
Sweden	S				
Switzerland	CH				
Ukraine	UA				
United Kingdom	UK (Note: The national identifier is optional on British registration plates. Registration plates with the "UK" identifier displayed on its own or with a Union Jack flag satisfy the requirements from the Vienna Convention on Road Traffic, and are valid in countries party to the Convention. The specification of plates incorporating the UK code was created by the British Number Plate Manufacturers Association, and is seen as the default design by the Department for Transport. Registration plates can also feature the national flag of England, Scotland or Wales together with their corresponding code or name (such as "ENG", "Eng" "ENGLAND" or "England"). These are valid within the UK, but a "UK" sticker must be affixed at the rear of the vehicle if driven abroad. Until Brexit, UK registration plates could be issued in the common EU format. This format cannot be issued after the end of the transition period. A "UK" sticker must be affixed at the rear of a vehicle with a registration plate displaying the EU emblem when driven abroad. Note: Many cars also have EU flag on if issued pre-Brexit and cars can have EU flag only with the code "GB"; these plates are not valid for international use, a "UK" sticker must be affixed at the rear of the vehicle if driven abroad.)				
Vatican City	V (Note: CV (Italian: Città del Vaticano) is used as a prefix on the licence plate number itself for private vehicles. The prefix used on official and government vehicles is SCV (Italian: Status Civitatis Vaticanae))				

=== Transcontinental countries ===
Territory	Code	Strip	Example	Motorcycle plates
Armenia	AM			
Azerbaijan	AZ			
Georgia	GE			
Russia	RUS			
Turkey	TR			

=== Dependent territories ===
Territory	Code	Strip	Example	Motorcycle plates
Åland Islands (Finland)	AX (Note: On 13 June 2025, the Secretary-General received from the Government of Finland a notification stating that it will change the distinguishing sign on vehicles registered on the Åland Islands from “FIN” to “AX”. This change took effect on 13 September 2025)			
Alderney (United Kingdom)	GBA			
Faroe Islands (Denmark)	FO			
Gibraltar (United Kingdom)	GBZ (Note: The EU strip is allowed but no longer issued by the local government after Brexit.)			
Guernsey (United Kingdom)	GBG			
Isle of Man (United Kingdom)	GBM			
Jersey (United Kingdom)	GBJ			

=== Disputed territories ===
Territory	Code	Strip	Example	Motorcycle plates
Abkhazia	ABH			
Kosovo	RKS			
Northern Cyprus	TRNC			
South Ossetia	RSO			
Transnistria	PMR			

== Timeline ==
Timeline of Vehicle registration plates of Europe from 1960 until today
Country	1960s										1970s										1980s										1990s										2000s										2010s										2020s
Country	0	1	2	3	4	5	6	7	8	9	0	1	2	3	4	5	6	7	8	9	0	1	2	3	4	5	6	7	8	9	0	1	2	3	4	5	6	7	8	9	0	1	2	3	4	5	6	7	8	9	0	1	2	3	4	5	6	7	8	9	0	1	2	3	4	5	6	7	8	9
Albania	AB 1234																								AB 12345							12 AB 123		AB 1234 A		AB 1234 A																AB 123 AB
Andorra	1234 PRINCIPAT D'ANDORRA										12345 PRINCIPAT D'ANDORRA																				A1234 PRINCIPAT D'ANDORRA																					A1234 AND PRINCIPAT D'ANDORRA
Austria	W 123.456																														W 12345 A														W 12345 A
Belarus	12-34 _{МИХ}																				х 1234 МИ												1234 AB								1234 ABC				1234 AB-1
Belgium	1234.A			A.AB.12										ABC•123																										ABC-123									123-ABC		1-ABC-123
Bosnia and Herzegovina																															AB-12345 A		AB 123-AB						123-A-123											A12-A-345
Bosnia and Herzegovina																															AB-12345 A		ТБ 123-45						123-A-123											A12-A-345
Bosnia and Herzegovina																															AB-12345 A				AB-1234 AB				123-A-123											A12-A-345
Bulgaria	Пз•X•1234																										ПЗ•1234•X						PA 1234 AX								PA 1234 AX								PA 1234 AX
Croatia																																	AB 1234-CD																								AB 1234-CD
Cyprus	AB 123													AB 123																	ABC 123														ABC 123									ABC 123
Czech Republic																																		ABC 12-12							1A2 12-12			1AB 1234
Denmark	KA 12.123																	AB 12 345
Denmark	KA 12.123																																																	AB 12 345
Estonia																																	123 ABC												123 ABC
Finland	ABC-12												ABC-123																													ABC-123
France	123 ABC 75																																				123 ABC 75													AB-123-AB
Germany	FL - AB 1234																																		FL AB 1234
Greece	123•123												AB-1234												ABC-1234																				ABC-1234
Hungary	AB•12•12																														ABC-123														ABC-123																		AB CD-123
Iceland	A12345																																							AB 123					AB 123			AB C12
Ireland	ABC 123										123 ABC																	87-AB-1234				91-AB-12345									00-AB-123456													131-AB-12345
Italy	MI 123456																MI MI 123456									MI 123456									AB 123AB					AB 123AB
Latvia																																			AB-1234										AB-1234
Liechtenstein	FL 12345
Lithuania																																	ABC 123												ABC 123
Luxembourg	12345						A 1234								AB 123														AB 123															AB 1234
Malta	1234																			A-1234																ABC ▪ 123
Moldova																																	AB AB 123		AB AB 123																		AB AB 123				ABC 012
Monaco	A123 PRINCIPAUTE DE MONACO																			A123 PRINCIPAUTE DE MONACO																																			A123 MC PRINCIPAUTE DE MONACO
Montenegro																																																	PG AB 123
Netherlands	AB-12-12				12-12-AB								12-AB-12					AB-12-AB														AB-AB-12							AB-AB-12		12-AB-AB										12-ABC-3
North Macedonia																																		AB РМ123-AB		AB AБ 123-AB																	AB AБ 1234 AB							AB AБ 1234 AB
Norway	A-12345											AB 12345																														AB 12345					AB 12345
Poland	AB-12-34																ABC 1234																								ABC 12AB						ABC 12AB
Portugal	AA-12-34																																12-34-AB						12-34-AB								12-AB-34														AA-01-AA
Romania	12,345-B						12-B-12345																										AB 12ABC															AB 12ABC
Russia	12-34 _{МОЦ}																				и 1234 ЦП												A 123 AB
San Marino	RSM 123						RSM 1234										RSM 12345													12345				A1234
Serbia																																	BG 123-456						BG 123-456												NS 123▪AB
Slovakia																																		ABC 12-12					AB-123AB							AB-123AB		AB 123AB
Slovenia																																	LJ A1-12A												LJ AB-12A						LJ AB-12A
Spain	AB-12345											AB-1234AB																													1234 ABC
Sweden	A 12345													ABC 123																																														ABC 12A
Sweden	A 12345																																											ABC 123
Switzerland	BE 123 456
Turkey	A 12 345		12 AB 1234																							12 AB 123												12 ABC 12
Ukraine																																		A1234 AB			123-45AB								AB 1234 CD											AB 1234 CD
United Kingdom	ABC 123			ABC 123A										ABC 123A										A123 ABC																		AB12 ABC
United Kingdom	ABC 123			ABC 123A										ABC 123A										A123 ABC																		AB12 ABC																				AB12 ABC	AB12 ABC
Northern Ireland	1234 ABC						ABC 1234							ABC 1234																												ABC 1234
Northern Ireland	1234 ABC						ABC 1234							ABC 1234																												ABC 1234																				ABC 1234	ABC 1234
Vatican City	CV 12345
Country	0	1	2	3	4	5	6	7	8	9	0	1	2	3	4	5	6	7	8	9	0	1	2	3	4	5	6	7	8	9	0	1	2	3	4	5	6	7	8	9	0	1	2	3	4	5	6	7	8	9	0	1	2	3	4	5	6	7	8	9	0	1	2	3	4	5	6	7	8	9
Country	1960s										1970s										1980s										1990s										2000s										2010s										2020s

Dependencies and disputed territories

Timeline of Vehicle registration plates of disputed, dependent and other territories in Europe from 1960 until today
Territory	1960s										1970s										1980s										1990s										2000s										2010s										2020s
Territory	0	1	2	3	4	5	6	7	8	9	0	1	2	3	4	5	6	7	8	9	0	1	2	3	4	5	6	7	8	9	0	1	2	3	4	5	6	7	8	9	0	1	2	3	4	5	6	7	8	9	0	1	2	3	4	5	6	7	8	9	0	1	2	3	4	5	6	7	8	9
Åland	ÅL123			ÅL 1234									ÅLA 123																				Åland ÅLA 123
Faroe Islands	Fø 1.234											Fø 12.345					F 12 345																				AB 123
Greenland									G 12.345								GR 12 345
Alderney	AY 123													AY 1234
Alderney	AY 123													AY 1234
Guernsey	12345
Guernsey	12345
Jersey	J12345																																										J123456
Jersey	J12345																																										J123456
Isle of Man	12AMN											MN 1234			MAN 123A					M123 MAN				MAN 1234		1234 MAN		BMN 123M							AMN-123-A
Gibraltar	G 12345																																									G 1234A																				G 1234A
Kosovo																																								123-KS-123														12 123-AB
Northern Cyprus															AB 123																							AB 123																					AB 123
Transnistria																																	A 123 AB

== See also ==
- International vehicle registration code
- European driving licence
