= Vehicle registration plates of the Soviet Union =

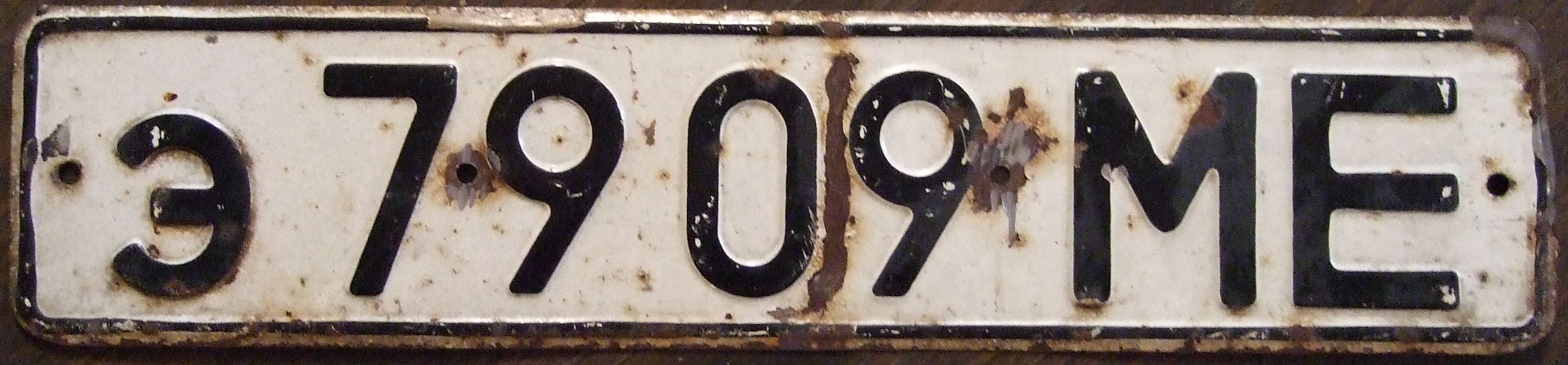
A passenger vehicle registration plate of the 1980 format from Moscow

Vehicle registration plates of the Soviet Union (Russian: Регистрационные знаки транспортных средств, Registratsionnye znaki transportnykh sredstv, lit. 'Registration Plates of Vehicles') were used in the Soviet Union for registrations of automobiles, motorcycles, heavy machinery, special-use vehicles as well as construction equipment, military vehicles and trailers. The international code for the Soviet Union was SU. Every vehicle registration plate contains a unique registration mark embossed on a metal plate or a plate made of other materials. All vehicles were required to display the plates on the front side and backside, with the exception of trailers and motorcycles, which were only required to display one on the backside.

1980 USSR series, used until 1994
Example	Description
ш 98 05 МК	Private
52 19 МНБ	Government, Police, Official
Т 124 327	Diplomats in USSR
Р 504 367	Car for export out of the USSR, foreign residents in USSR

== History ==
The Russian Empire's first attempts to register horse-drawn carriages driving through cities were taken in the 19th century to prevent tax evasion by their owners. Sometime in the 19th century, every coachman and his carriage had to have a registration number which was only valid for a year, and they had to pay the tax in order to have a replacement. In the 1890s, after cyclists were legally admitted into traffic, bicycles were also made subjects to compulsory registration. This was later extended to automobiles.

There was no standard for the registration numbers at that time. Every city had its own plate format and color, and the background color for the plates could vary from year to year in a single city. The plates were required to contain a numbers-only registration number and optionally the name of the city, the year of issue, the type of the vehicle as well as other information as demanded by local authorities. Plates for automobiles were similar to those for bicycles in appearance, but are five to eight times as large. Regular fixation points were not provided for automobiles at that time, so the plates were simply drilled to have two holes, and were suspended with ropes going through them.

In 1920 the first attempt to standardize vehicle registration plates was made. On June 13, 1920, a decree named "On registration plates" was published, which required all vehicles to mount the front license plate on the left wing and the rear one on the backside. In 1927 the standardization proceeded with the introduction of "Rules of the All-Union Registry of Cars and Motorcycles", which standardized the form of the plates, dimensions for front and rear plates, as well as those for motorcycles, the color and height of the characters, and the width of each character stroke, whereas the background color continued to vary annually.

However, these changes did not affect registration plates of carriages and bicycles, which continued to vary in shape and color until their cancellation; this took place in the 1930s for carriages, but bicycles continued to be registered until 1970.

By the early 1930s the number of automobiles and motorcycles skyrocketed, with frequent trips from a city to another "on motors". To conduct a full registration of all cars and motorcycles across the country, a unified standard for license plates for cars and motorcycles came into force in 1931.

=== 1931 to 1946 ===
During the 1930s the format of plates never standardized.

The first Soviet registration plates issued in 1931 had an "L-NN-NN" format, where L represents a Cyrillic letter and N being a number. Every registration is linked to a single vehicle, while motorcycle plates differ from those for cars in terms of dimensions. Two license plates were issued to every vehicle: a frontal plate and a rear plate. Frontal plates for motorcycles were to be mounted along the front wing of a vehicle, while rear ones were to be mounted perpendicular to the rear wing. Registration plates for test-drive vehicles appeared later, which contained the word "проба" (proba, literally "test") on the top, with the first pair of digits absent, therefore forming the format "L-NN". Two major drawbacks of this format were later found, with the first being that the letter was issued in sequential order regardless of any situation, while the second is that a letter could stand for two sparsely populated regions, and on the other hand, a large city could possess a number of letters. These drawbacks caused the termination of this format in 1934.

In 1934, a new replacement standard was set: the letter on the former design was changed to a digit, and there was the name of the registry, or "Dortrans" below the digits. There were at first 45 Dortrans, one for each region, under the administration of the Central management of highways and dirt roads and road transport at the Council of People's Commissars of the Union of Soviet Socialist Republics, known in short as the TsUDorTranse, and then after a reorganization of administrative divisions, the number went up to 52. The former format was considered temporarily valid and owners must change to the new format before July 1, 1934. The format was not strictly defined, i.e. there need not to be exactly five digits on the plate, and the name of the region could reach up to 8 characters excluding dots and dashes, which made it often written in abbreviated form. Test and transit plates remained their format, except that the name of the Dortran was replaced by the word "транзит" (tranzit, "transit"), or "проба" (proba, "test"). These plates have the same color schemes as ordinary plates, but there were also plates for experimental vehicles in an inverse scheme.

At the end of 1936 the format changed once more, when the beginning of the sequence switched to a two-letter code of the regional registry, followed by two pairs of numbers separated by a hyphen, which made it an "LL NN-NN" pattern. The code uses letters of the Russian alphabet except for "Ё", "Й", "Ъ", "Ы" and "Ь". There was a single-line frontal plate plus a double-line rear plate for each vehicles, with motorcycle plates bearing the same format, albeit in a smaller size. This difference existed until 1994. Trial and transit numbers also remained, which replaced the region code with the word "транзит" (tranzit, "transit"), below which positioned a factory code.

Near the end of the 1930s, in coordination to the current format, there was also a so-called "уменьшенный" (umen'shennyy, literally "reduced") format: The plate was smaller, used a narrower and slimmer font, while the regional code became physically smaller, was placed in the top-left corner, with the numbers down-scaled. At the same time a single format was developed for trailers, but seldom given. Subsequently, this format became the basis for the next change.

Shortly before 1941, all military equipment received a number format different from the civil format, the "L-N-NN-NN" format. Before this there was no system for military plates at all. Moreover, there are a number of documented cases of plate type violations, including arbitrary hyphenation, adding of stars or anchors, and even violations concerning format, such as plates containing 4 to 6 digits, with 4 digits often for motorcycles, but with exceptions.

At the end of the 1930s, the first diplomatic plates were issued. Based on the "reduced format", a single digit replaced the first pair of numbers, with a large letter Д in the upper right corner.

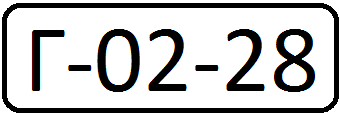
The first unified car number of the USSR 1931-1934

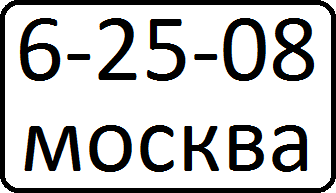
Car number of the USSR 1934-1936

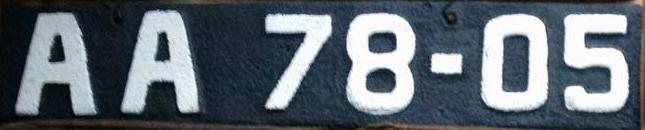
Car number of the USSR 1936-1946, front

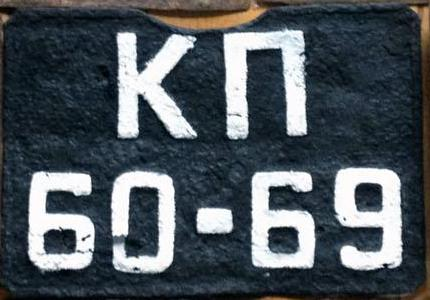
Car number of the USSR 1936-1946, rear

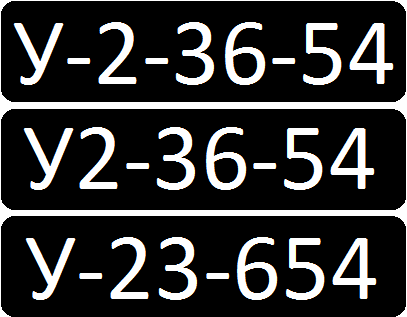
Military car plates of the USSR 1940-1960

=== 1946 to 1959 ===
After World War II the registration went into chaos with cars that had lost documentation, "mobilized" machines, war trophy equipment, automobiles and captured re-registered vehicles. All of these had to be taken into account, which prompted a mandatory replacement of old license plates with new ones in 1946.

The new format was once again based on the old "reduced" format, only changing the color of the background to orange and the color of letters and numbers to black. Diplomatic plates used a different "Д-NN" format for frontal plates, with the Д on the top row and the digits on the bottom row for rear plates. There were also formats for trailers, which formerly bore the same number as the truck attached to it. The format for trailers was the same as the rear version of civil plates, only with the inscription "прицеп" (pritsep, "trailer") next to the regional code.

At that time, there existed a white-on-black format which is to be assigned to business- and privately owned cars. Later, this color scheme along with diplomatic plates were put into use.

An interesting fact is that this standard did not concern test and transit plates. As "test" plates were common in autonomous regions, plates starting with "00" or "01" were often reserved for them, and the transit plate could be produced in any form on paper.

Front plates for motorcycles ceased to be issued in 1946, ending the trend in which all motorcycles, similar to cars, had to have two plates, of which the front plate was single-lined, and attached to the front fender.

Since the 1940s, large enterprises and car factories were allowed to have their own license plates for test-drive and internal transport, without leaving the territory of the factory. Some enterprises have modified their plates to conform to the standard, while others remained unchanged. For example, cars for internal transport within VAZ in the 1980s have registration plates similar to the Soviet standard, but the three-letter suffix was always the letters "ВАЗ". These plates could still be found in some modern car factories.

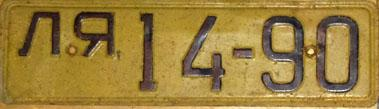
USSR car number 1946-1959, front

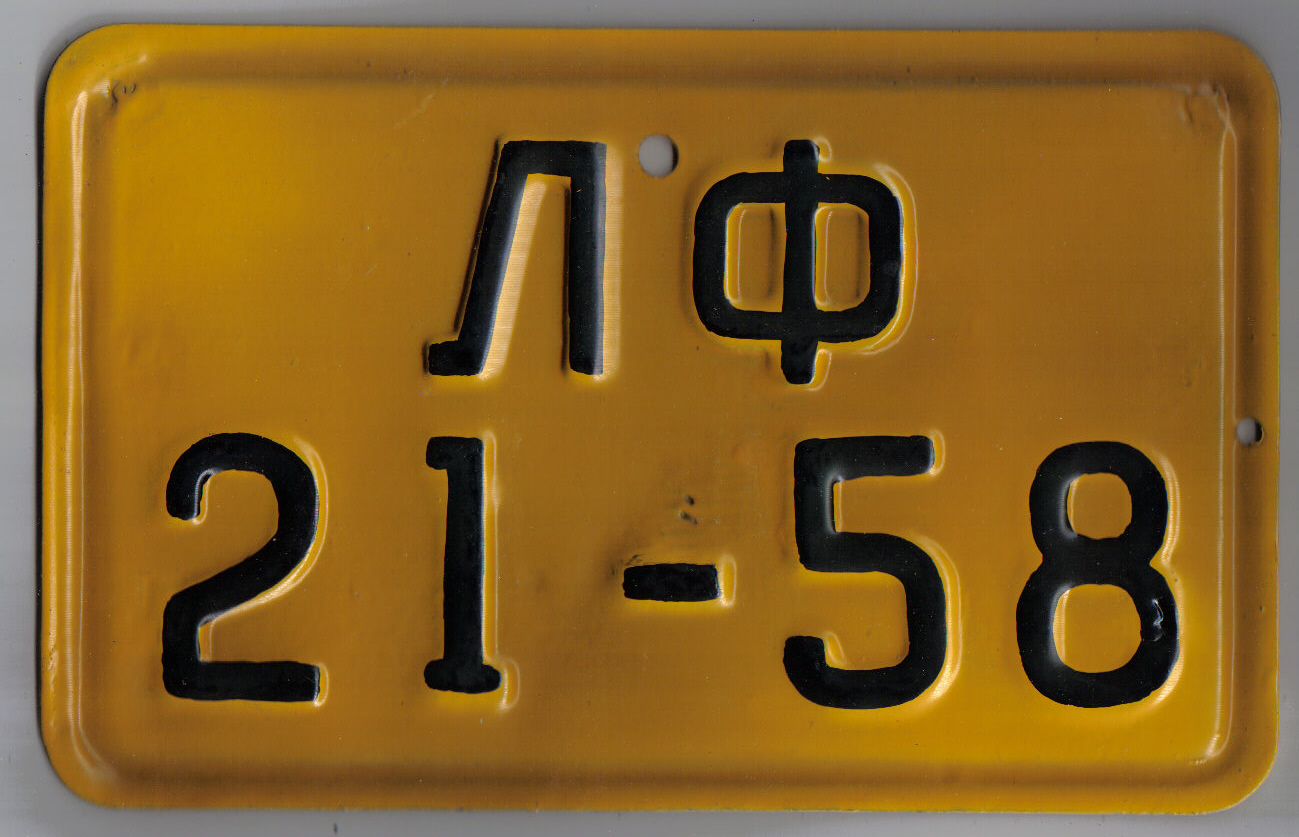
USSR car number 1946-1959, rear

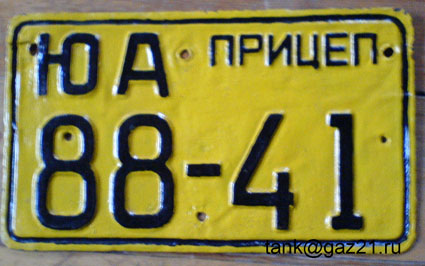
USSR car number 1946-1959, trailer

=== 1959 to 1980 ===
In 1959, a reform on the format of registration plates within the USSR began, changing the format to "NN-NN LLL", with the first two letters acting as a regional code, and the last letter simply being a serial, again in a white-on-black scheme. Plates for trailers, as in the previous format, received only two letters, both making up the regional code, with the word "прицеп" added next to it. The introduction of the third letter would cause the numbers and letters to physically exceed the limits of a registration plate in the previous formats, which is another reason for the reform.

In the early 1960s, military equipment were issued new types of registration plates, with the format almost identical to the civil type, but dropping the third letter (therefore creating the "NN-NN LL" format). Contrary to previous formats where the letters and numbers carried no information on the unit that was issued plates, the regional code was organized by the Armed Forces of the USSR themselves, which is why military plates do not actually "collide" with civil ones.

In 1965, two new types of plates were introduced specifically for tractors and tractor trailers. Previously, registration for tractors was not compulsory and motorcycle plates were issued to them instead, while trailers were not subject to registration at all. The color scheme was inherited from the previous format as black-on-orange, but the indication of a tractor and a trailer has been shortened to "ТР-Р" and "ПР-П" (shortened from "трактор" and "прицеп", "tractor" and "trailer") respectively. Sometimes a tractor bearing a plate that has a white-on-black scheme could be seen, which was originally intended for military use. However, this distinction soon faded as civil tractors and military ones soon bore plates of the same format.

In response to a growing car market and the increasing demand of purchasing and selling cars from different regions, the oblong transit plate was introduced, based on paper. When registered, the car was given two plates which should be attached to the inner side of the windshield and the rear glass. The word "транзит" and "передний номер" (perednyy nomer, "front number") or "задний номер" (zadnyy nomer, "rear number") was written on the top row, the second row contained the three-letter regional code (or the two-letter one for military vehicles), and the third row housed the four digits. The oblong metal transit plate was similar to the paper plate, but the regional code contained only 2 letters, which were positioned beneath the word "транзит". This format does not distinguish between civil and military equipment.

The diplomatic format received a change as well. The color scheme was the inverse of that of normal plates (white-on-black). Initially, it was the same as the previous diplomatic format, only with the letter "Д" moved to the first place (or to the bottom row on rear plates), but later on the Cyrillic letter eventually got replaced by its Latin equivalent, "D". From the mid-1960s onward the standard for plates belonging to foreign entities was in force, which sets the format as "L-NN-NNN", where a "D" in the place of L meant a member of diplomatic representatives, a K for news correspondents, and an M for sales representatives. There was a slight change for the plates beginning with M, which removed the dash between the letter and the first number. For example, "M51 01-10" where the first two numbers succeeding the M is the country code.

In the same year, three more variants were introduced, which replaced the regional code with the word "проба", "полигон"(poligon, "testing grounds"), "спорт"(sport), or "милиция" (militsia, "police"). The "Testing grounds" and "Sport" plates bore only one digit at the start of the number sequence, which were issued to vehicles meant for testing on the automobile testing grounds and for those taking part in sports events, respectively. All of these had their sequence drawn onto the board instead of embossed on it. Motorcycles belonging to the MVD initially had these three variants, but after a standard was introduced later, motorcycles from MVD began receiving regular plates.

Since this standard was introduced, all vehicles travelling abroad for a short period of time had to receive a "replacement plate" before leaving the USSR. The format of these replacement plates retained the white-on-black scheme, but the letters forming the three-letter code was restricted to those that coincide in shape with Latin letters, and special regional codes for exiting the USSR were reserved. These replacement plates were either valid All-Union or republic-wide. Upon travelling abroad one has to get a replacement plate from the traffic police (with the exception of those who had plates that had no special Cyrillic letters), and must hand the replacement plate over when one returns to acquire his/her original plates.

At first the switch from the 1946 format to the new format was not compulsory, but a decree issued in 1967 required all vehicles to replace their plates. Despite the decree, citizens were not in a hurry to replace the plates, and the traffic police didn't insist on this much either. In 1970, on the 100th anniversary of the birth of V. I. Lenin, a decision was made regarding restoration of order, which created a stir within areas of the National Traffic Police. One consequence of this spur-of-the-mind decision was the decision to terminate registration of all traffic police mopeds and bicycles. Before this, mopeds had a reduced size of normal license plates, and in a reverse format, and the plates for bicycles differ from city to city with annual re-registration.

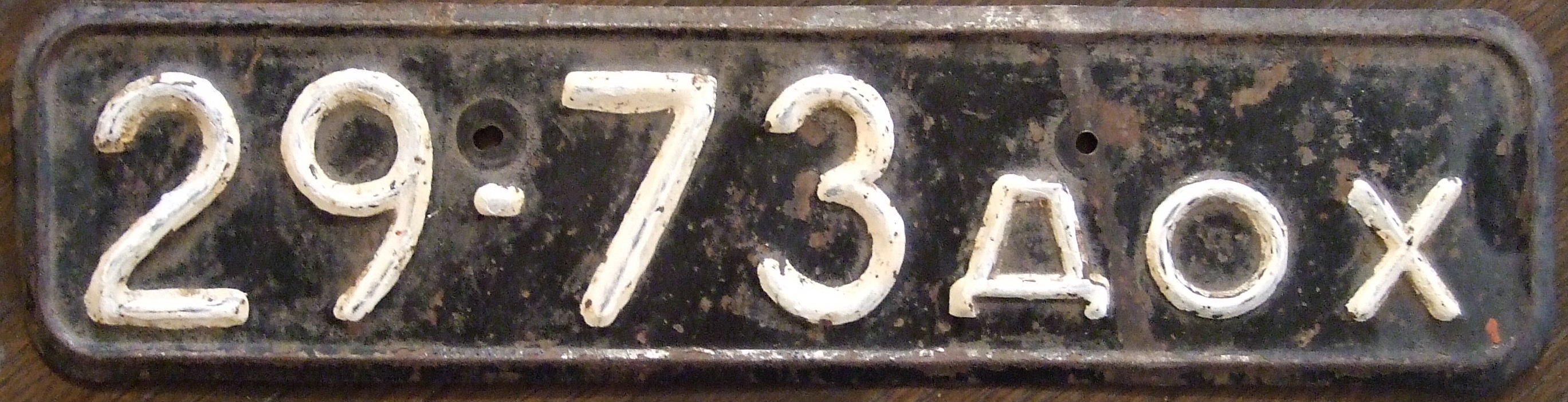
Front car number plate 1959-1980

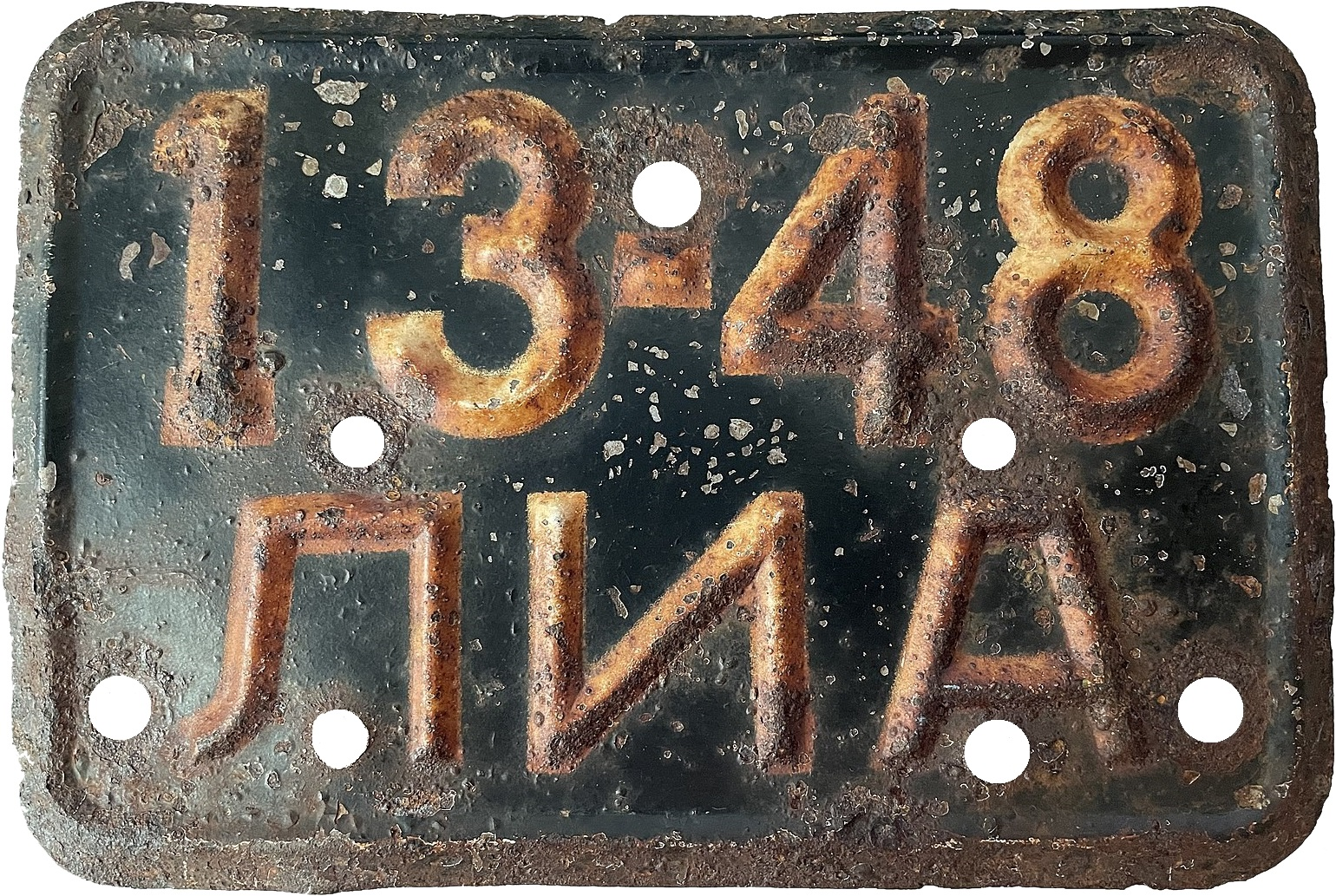
Rear car and motorcycle and moped number plate 1959-1980

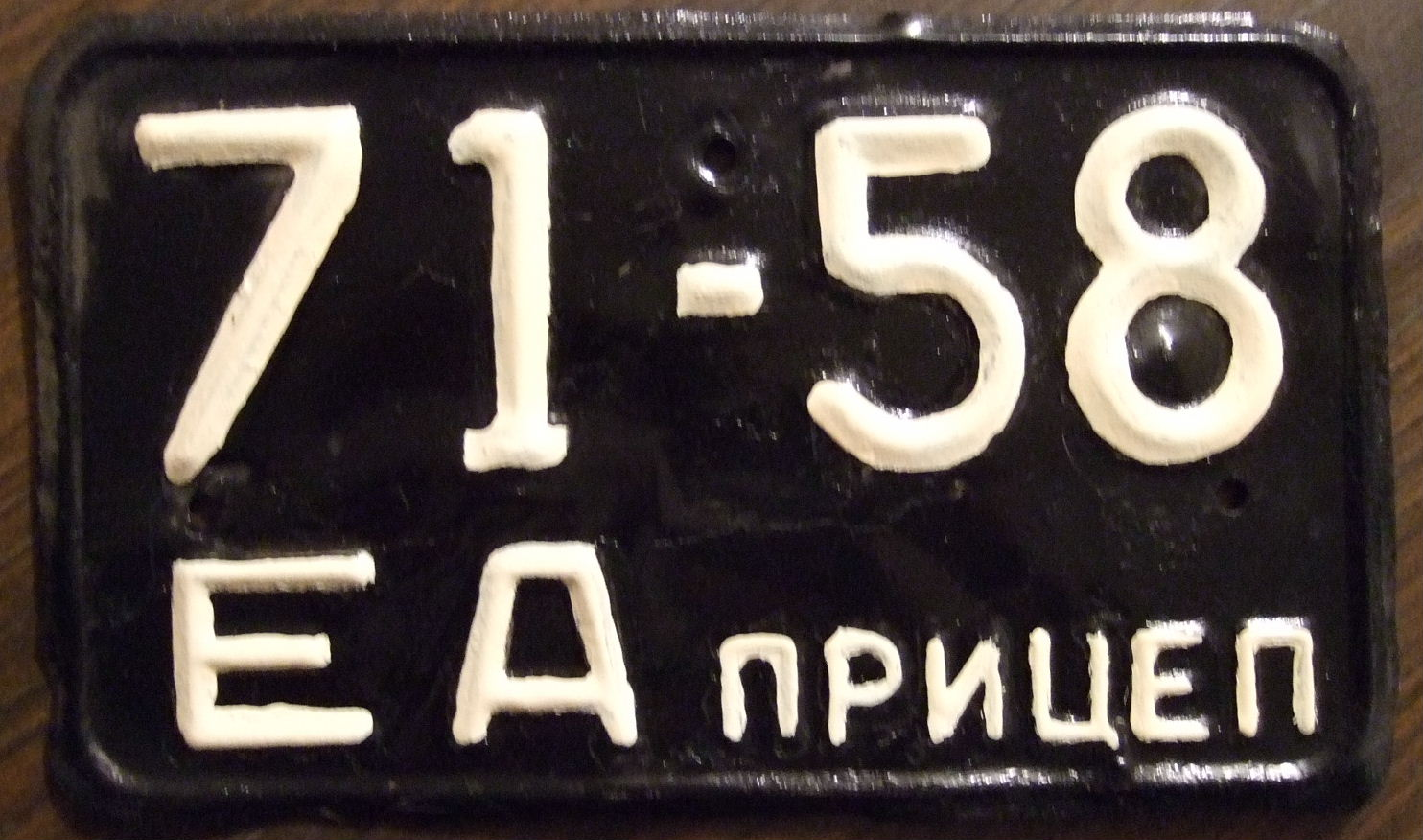
Car trailer number plate 1959-1980

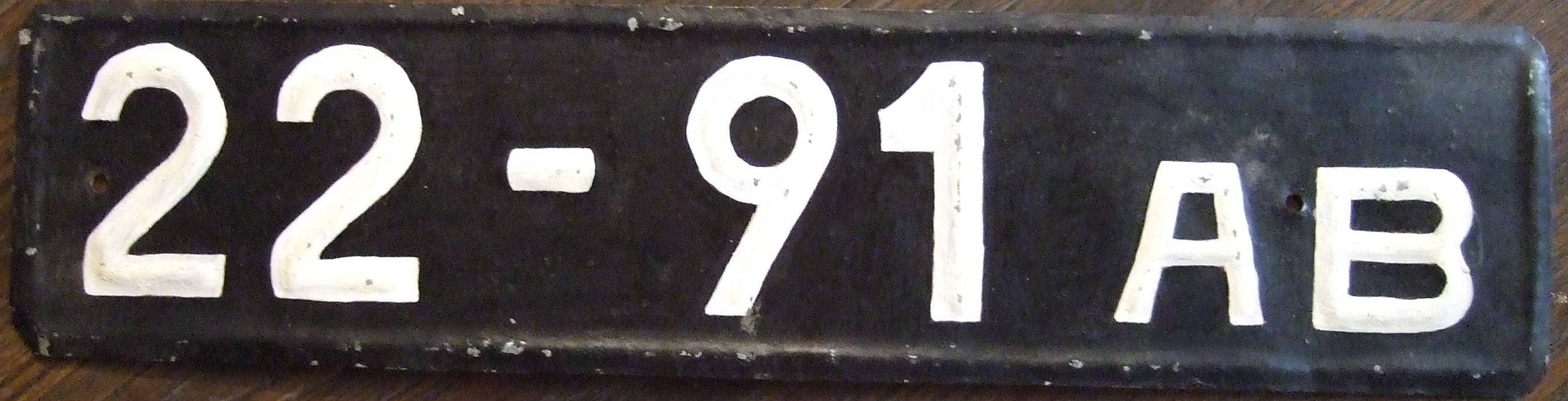
Military car number plate (front) 1959-1994

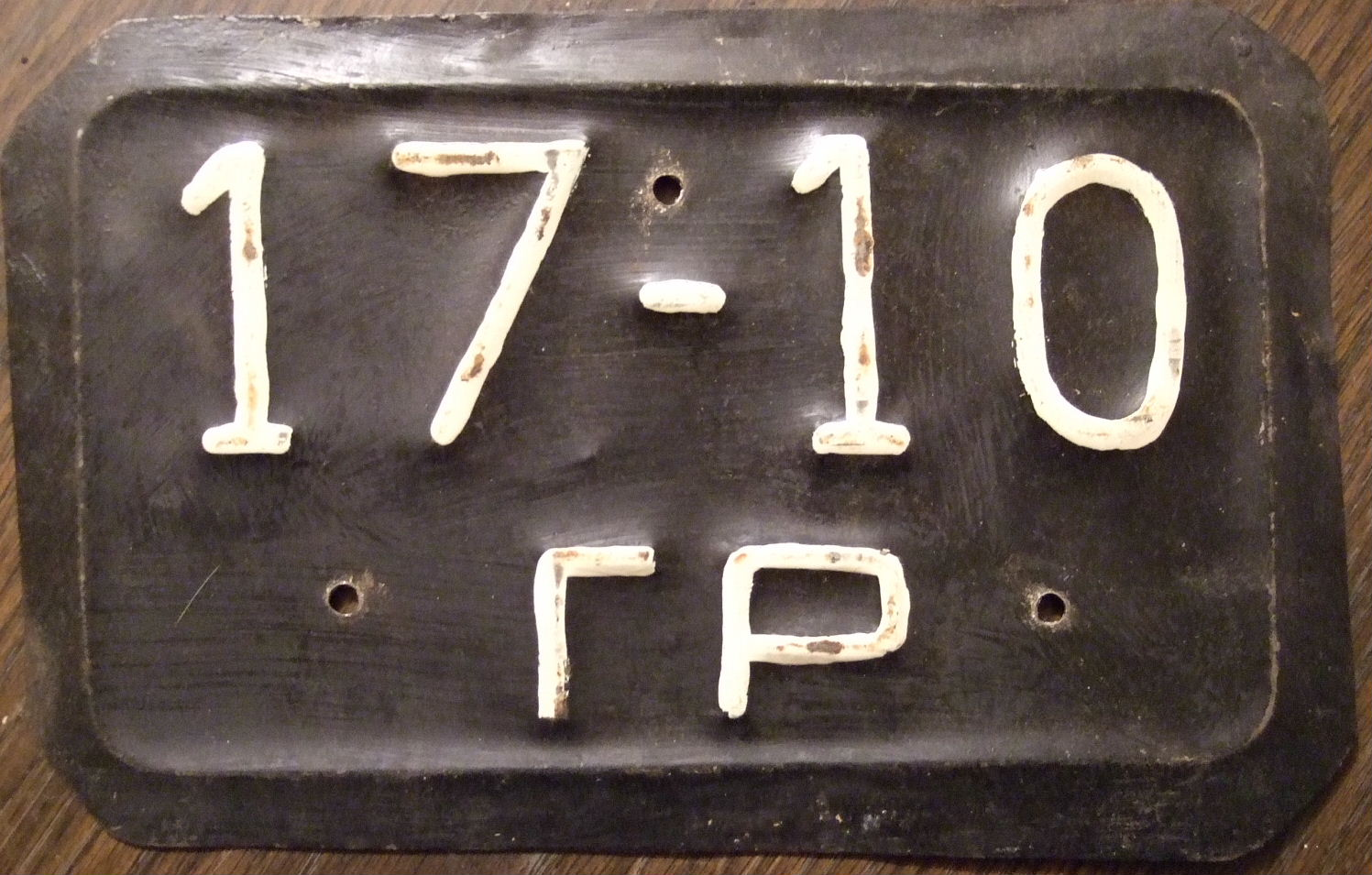
Military car number plate (rear) 1959-1994

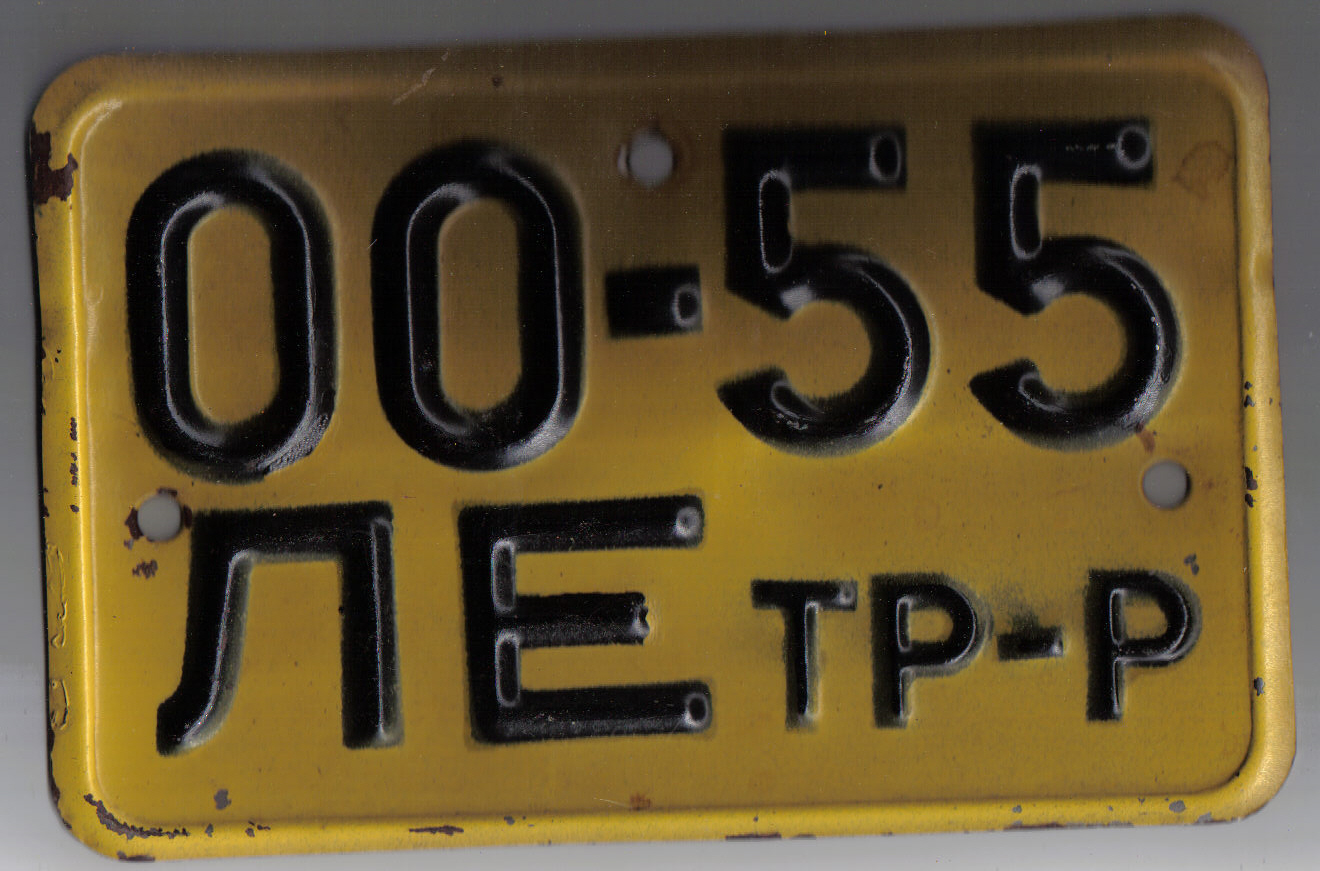
Tractor number plate 1965-1980

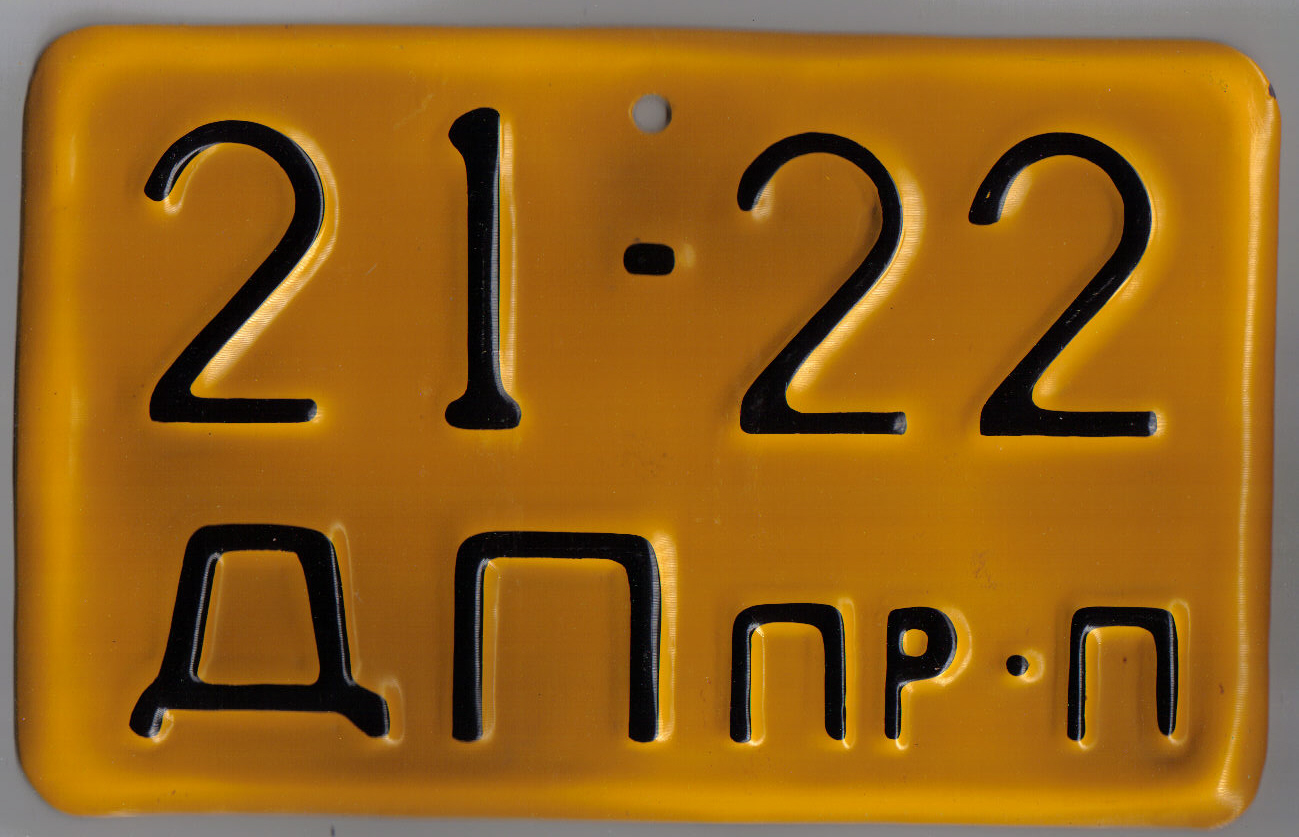
Tractor trailer number plate 1965-1980

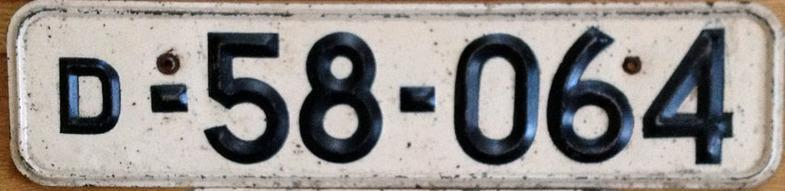
Diplomatic number plate (front) 1967-1980

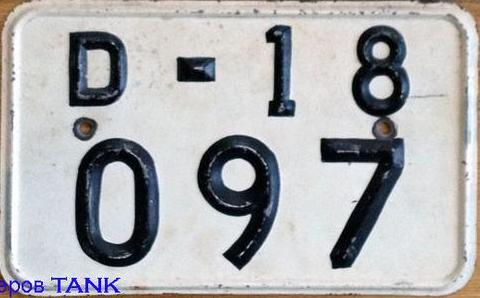
Diplomatic number plate (rear) 1967-1980

=== 1980 to 1994 ===
In 1980, on the eve of the Moscow Olympic Games, the next reform of plates was conducted. This standard, developed in 1977, inverted the color scheme again to black-on-white. There were two basic variants: one for civil vehicles which were in the "L NN NN LL" format, and the other for government vehicles that bore the "NN NN LLL" format. Another difference between government plates and civilian plates is that the first letter of civilian plates were smaller than the rest, while the letters of government plates were of equal size. The square plate was used as the rear plate of trucks, buses and motorcycles. Private vehicles initially had only the oblong plate, but in addition to GOST in 1992, production of double-row rear plates of private vehicle standard was allowed, which housed the letters in the top row, the first letter still being smaller than the rest, and the bottom row the digits. In 1989, special plates for special-use vehicles (such as emergency services) were introduced with the format "LLL NNNN".

The standard imposed further restrictions on the use of letters, letter "Щ" was added to the prohibited letters as a result, but this letter continued to appear in tractor and tractor trailer plates, as well as serial beginning with "КЩ". In all other situations this letter is not used. The military plates remain unaffected as they retained the old standard.

The 1980 sample continued to change with time, affecting the designs of the letters and digits. Numbers 6 and 9 initially had straight "tails", but then the tails became arc-shaped. Zero was first with straight vertical lines, later becoming a more "egg-shaped" glyph. In Krasnoyarsk Krai the plates have a capital letter "Э", with all projections formerly of the same length, but the upper and lower arcs of the letter were later lengthened and rounded, the central stroke unaffected. Generally, plates issued later have numbers and letters bolder than earlier ones.

At the same time, vehicles of the Russian mining communities on Svalbard, which were previously unregistered, began to receive plates that had a format similar to government plates: four numerals with leading zeros, followed by "АРБ" (ARB) for Barentsburg or "АРП" (ARP) for Pyramiden (Automachina Rudnika - “mining vehicle” - Barentsburg or Pyramiden). These plates were made locally and thus were either flat painted or with different fonts.

Special plates of the former standard were still left to the armed forces' vehicles, trailers and tractors, as well as diplomats and foreign residents. The military format remained unchanged since 1959, thus the plates belonging to the military began to stand out against the general population. In the late 1980s to the 1990s an updated type of military plates bearing the same coloring scheme and format, but with an appearance similar to civilian plates was developed. But due to the military being reluctant to switch to the new type and a new Russian standard that was put into use in 1993, this type was never widely used and are very rare to see.

Plates for trailers and tractors also went through changes, coloring scheme was put in sync with the civilian plates, but the shape was modified to a square with a "cut" bottom, sloping towards each other, making it a six-sided shape, and bore the format "NN NN LL", with the letters on the bottom and the shorter side. This format is turned upside-down for trailers and special equipment. Different from civilian plates, the regional codes did not bore relationship with the registration region in the same way as civilian plates. For example, the code "КЭ", used for Krasnoyarsk Krai on civilian plates, was issued to the Kurgan region instead, and for Krasnoyarsk Krai itself the code "ЦЦ" was used.

Diplomatic plates changed as well: The format changed to "L NNN NNN", and private vehicles used by consuls had the formal "CMD NNN N". In addition, the plates were distinguished by color: Vehicles belonging to diplomatic missions have a white-on-red scheme, while all others bore a black-on-light-orange scheme. The first three numbers on all red diplomatic plates and light-orange plates starting with letters К or М is the country code, which ranges from 001 to 130, while the first three numbers on other plates (namely the light-orange plates starting with Н or Р) stands for the region in which the vehicle was registered, and starts from 501, with all the codes listed below. The letter in the series have different meanings:

Letter	Meaning
D	Embassy staff with diplomatic status
T	Technical staff of embassies
K	Foreign correspondents
M	Sales representative of a foreign company
H	Foreign citizen
P	Car for export out of the USSR

There was also motorcycle and trailer plates for foreigners, with dimensions identical to the ones mentioned above, but with a light-orange background.

In the early 1990s, due to a lack of traffic police regulation, there were frequent plate type violations in certain regions. For example, a plate that was meant for tractor trailers or motorcycles could be issued to a private car, whereas motorcycles themselves could get a plate for trailers instead.

In addition, traffic police since 1989 have been officially allowed to permanently retain a number of plates, which caused cars belonging to different regions to carry plates that were meant for a single region. To stop the corruption, a new standard was introduced, which did not require owners to give up previous plates.

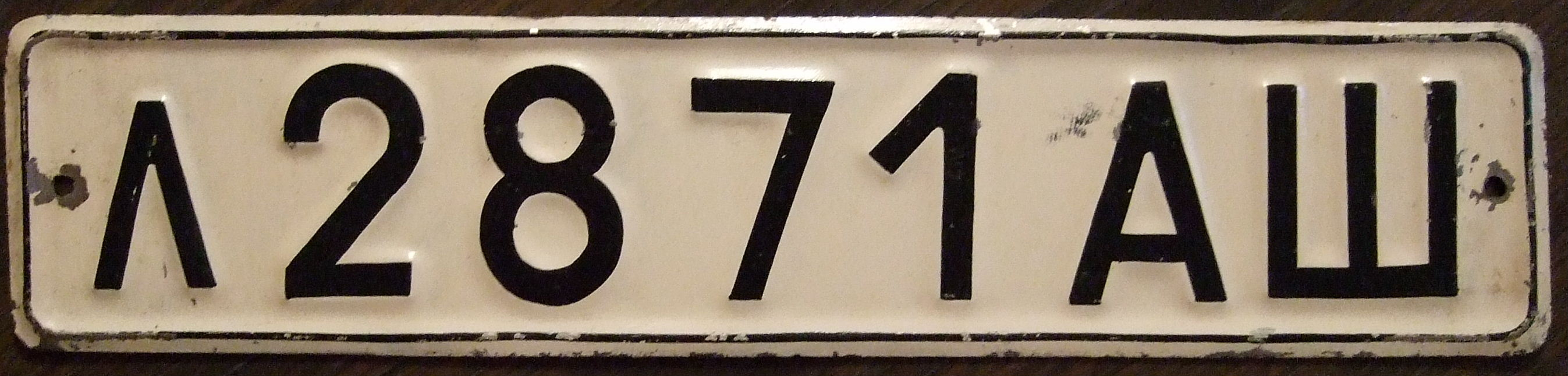
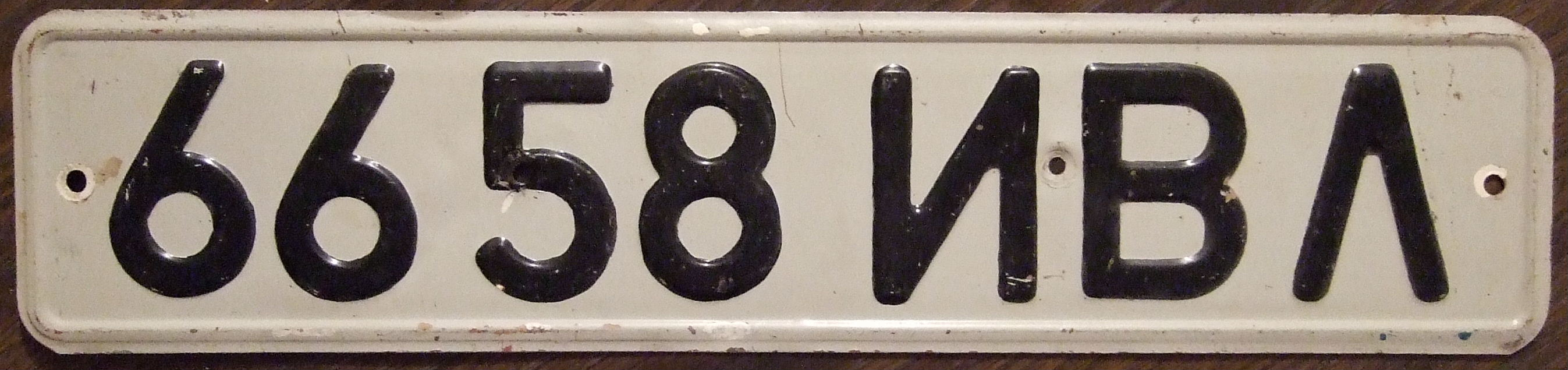
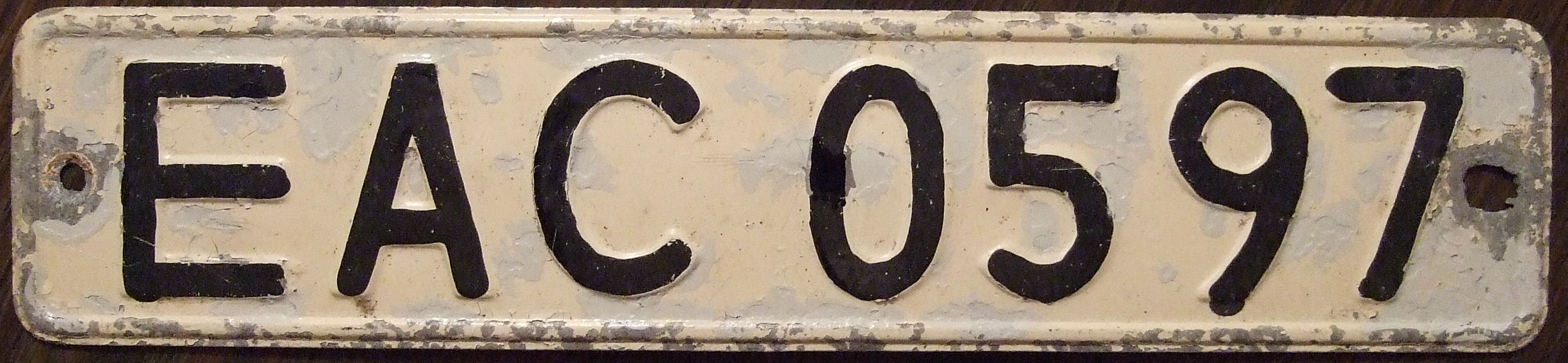
Car license plates 1980-1994 (top to bottom): private transport, state transport, special transport

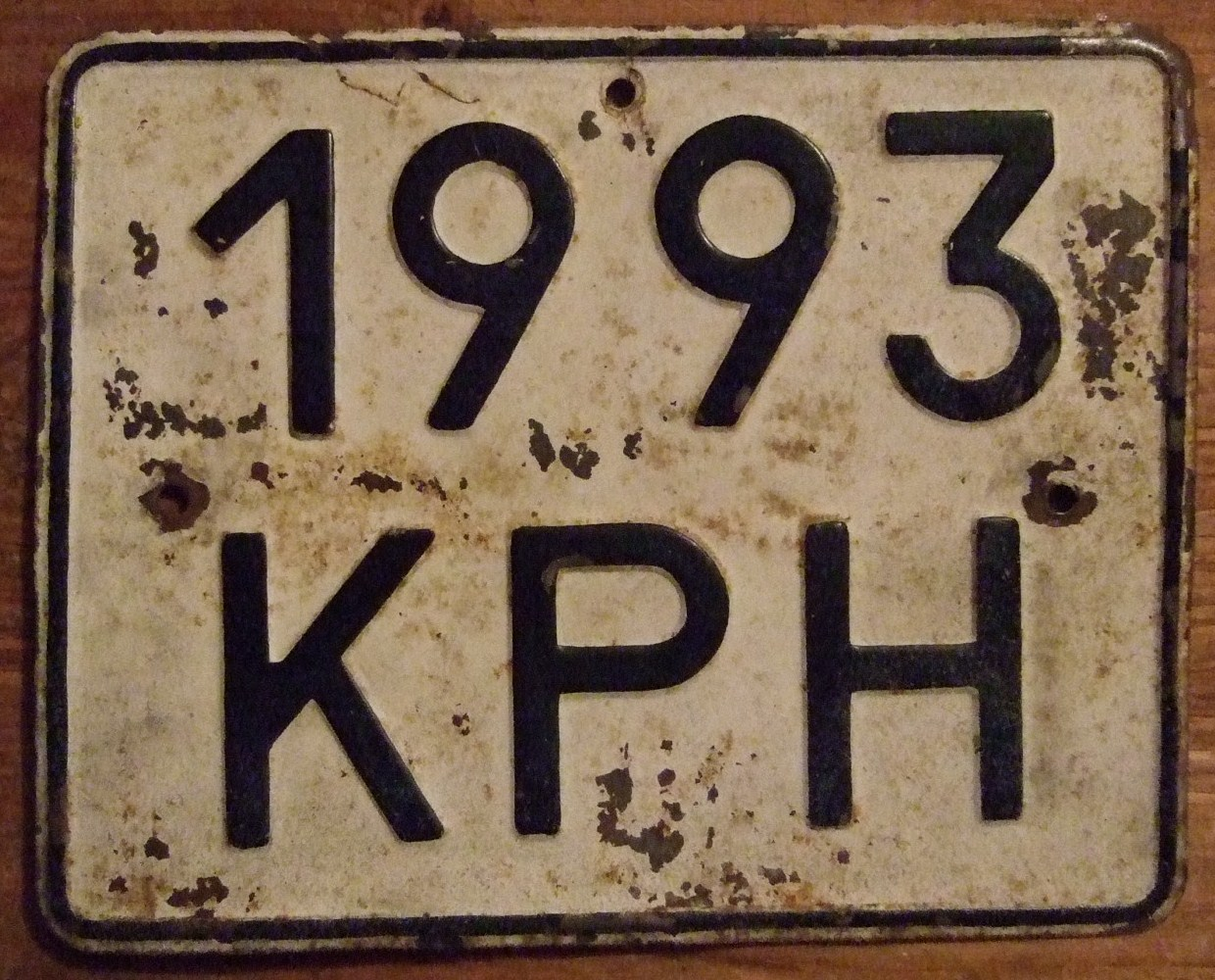
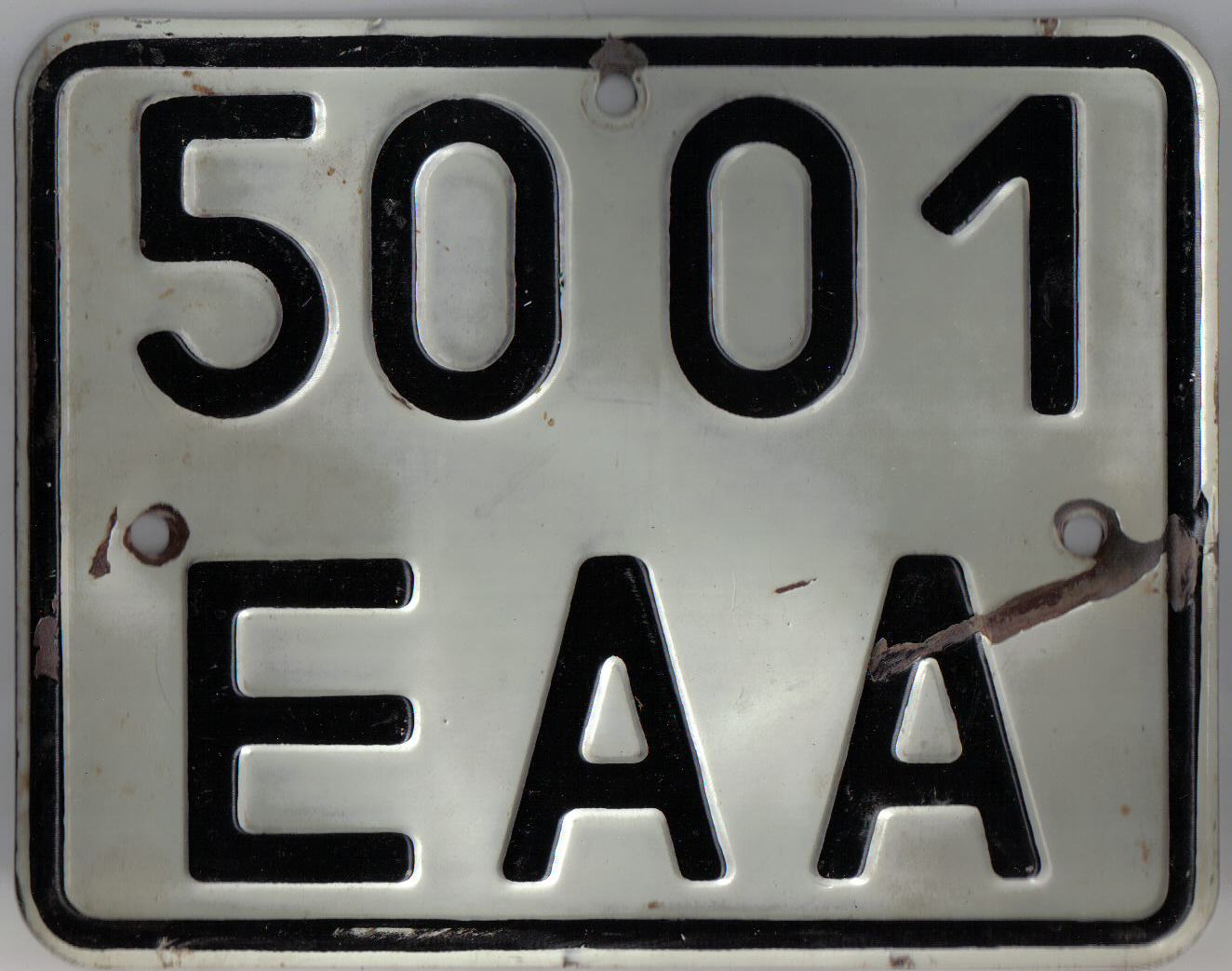
Rear license plate of state vehicles (top) and motorcycle license plate (bottom) 1980-1994

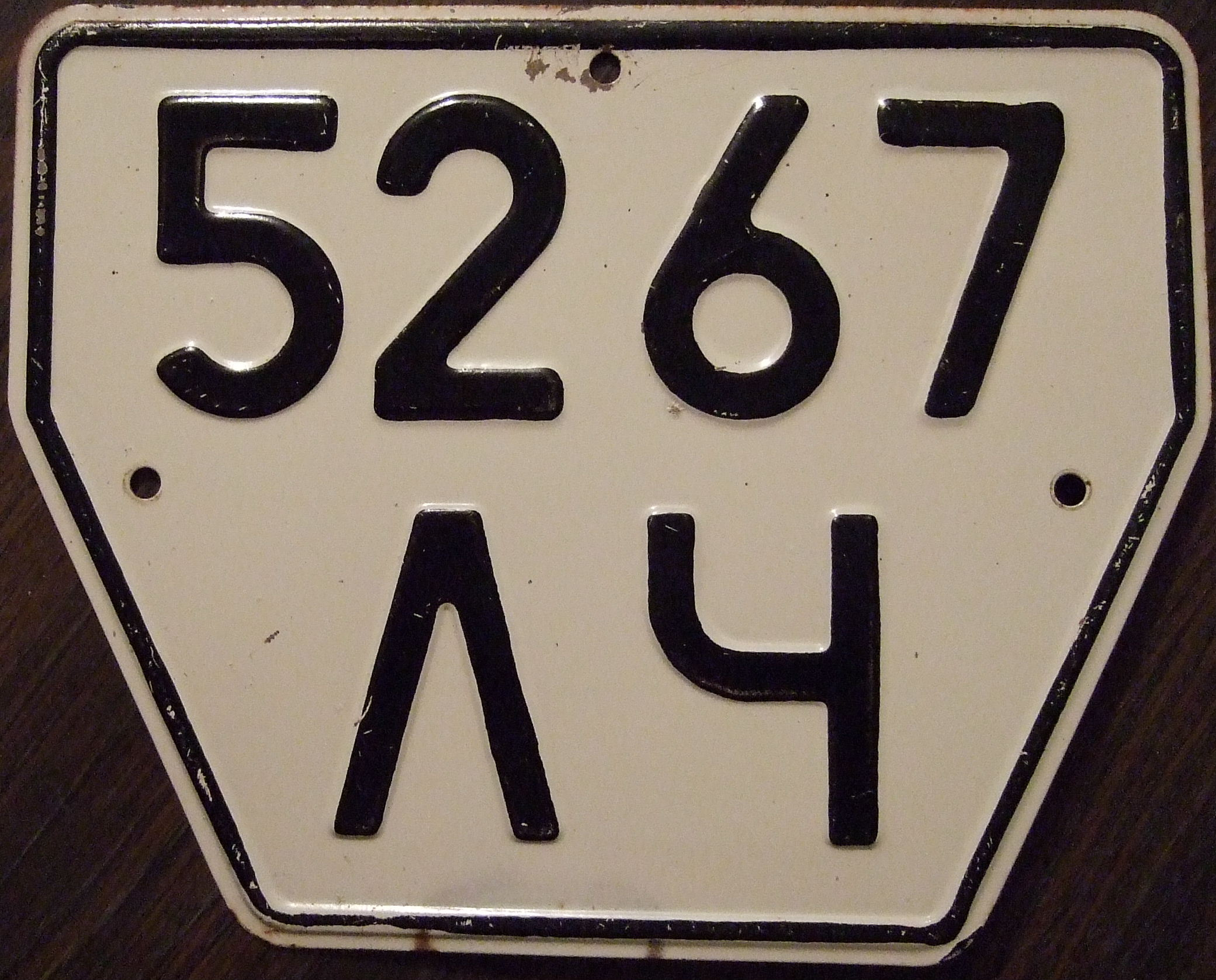
Trailer license plate 1980-1994

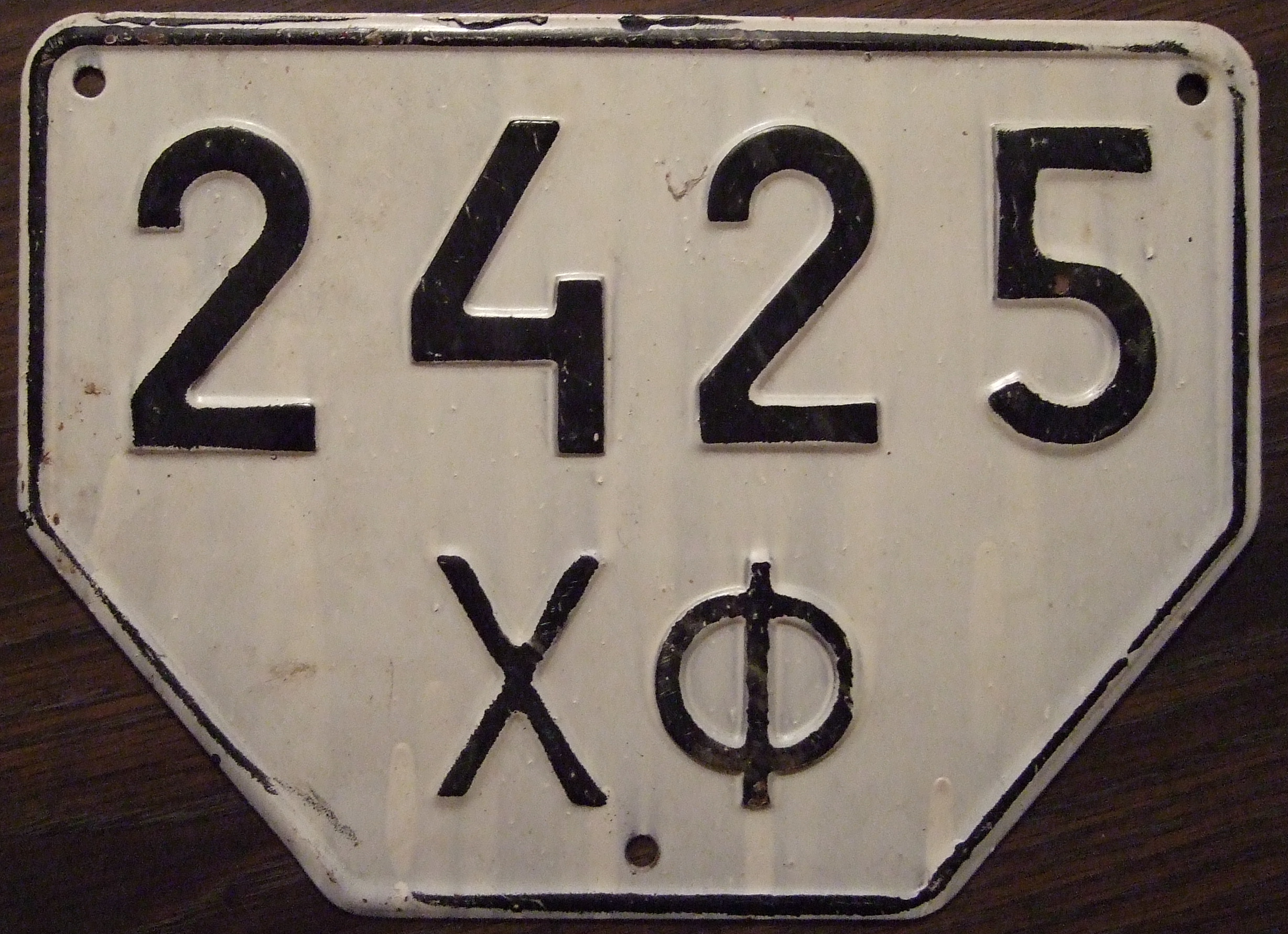
Tractor license plate 1980-1994

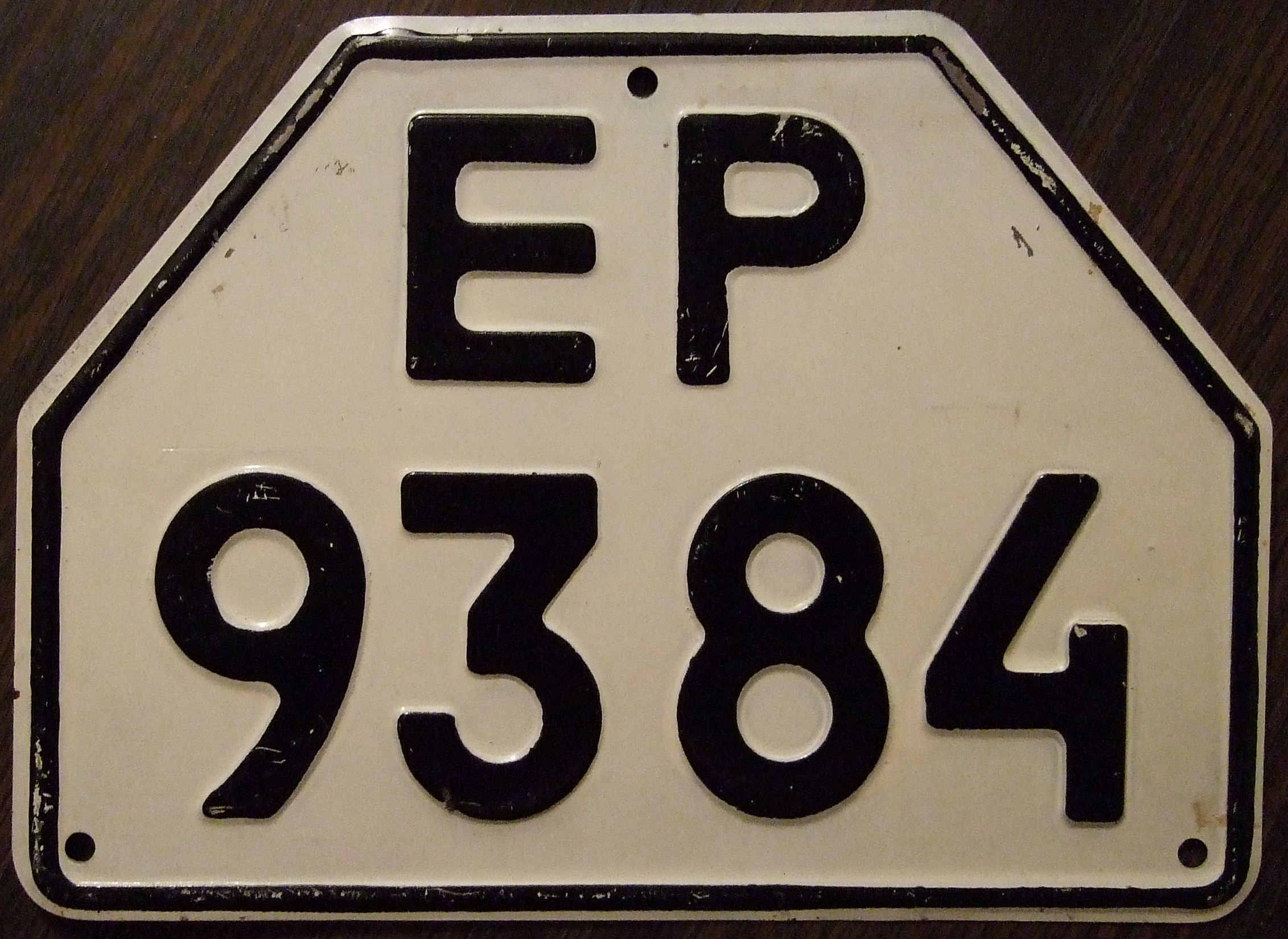
Tractor trailer license plate 1980-1994

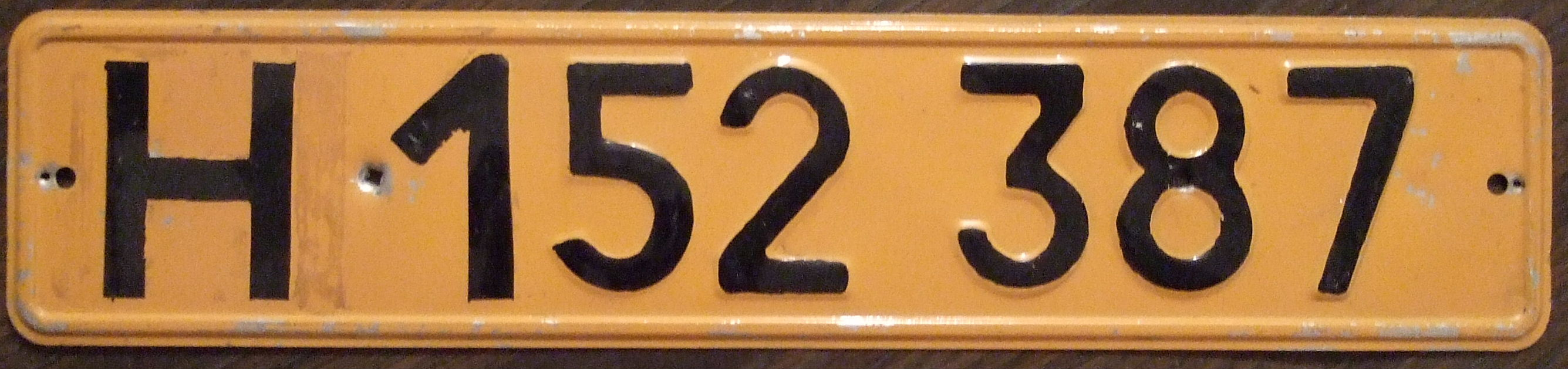
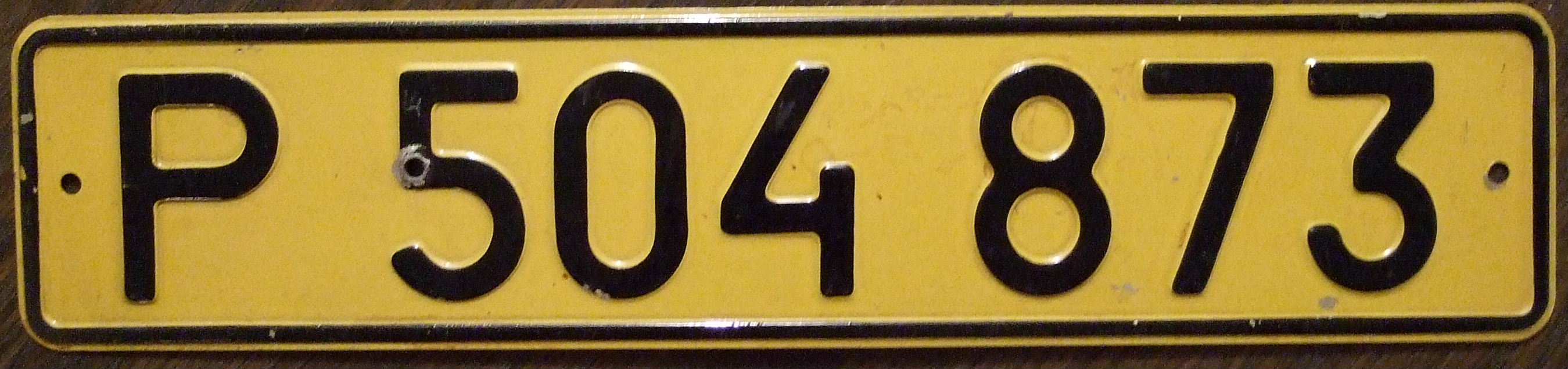
Car license plates of foreign residents and export vehicles 1980-1994

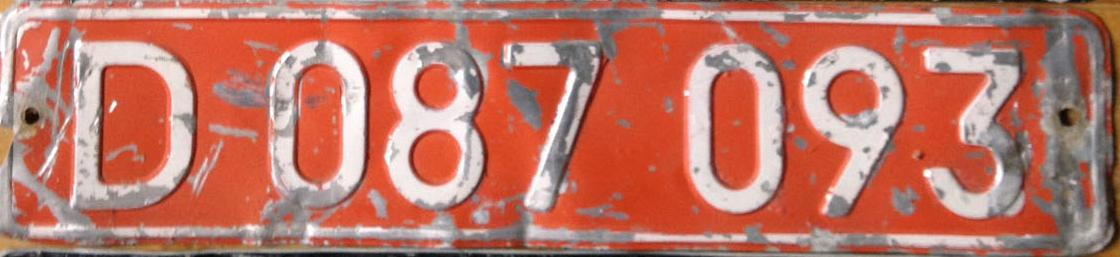
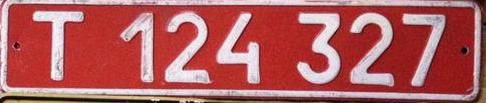
Car license plates of diplomatic missions 1980-1994

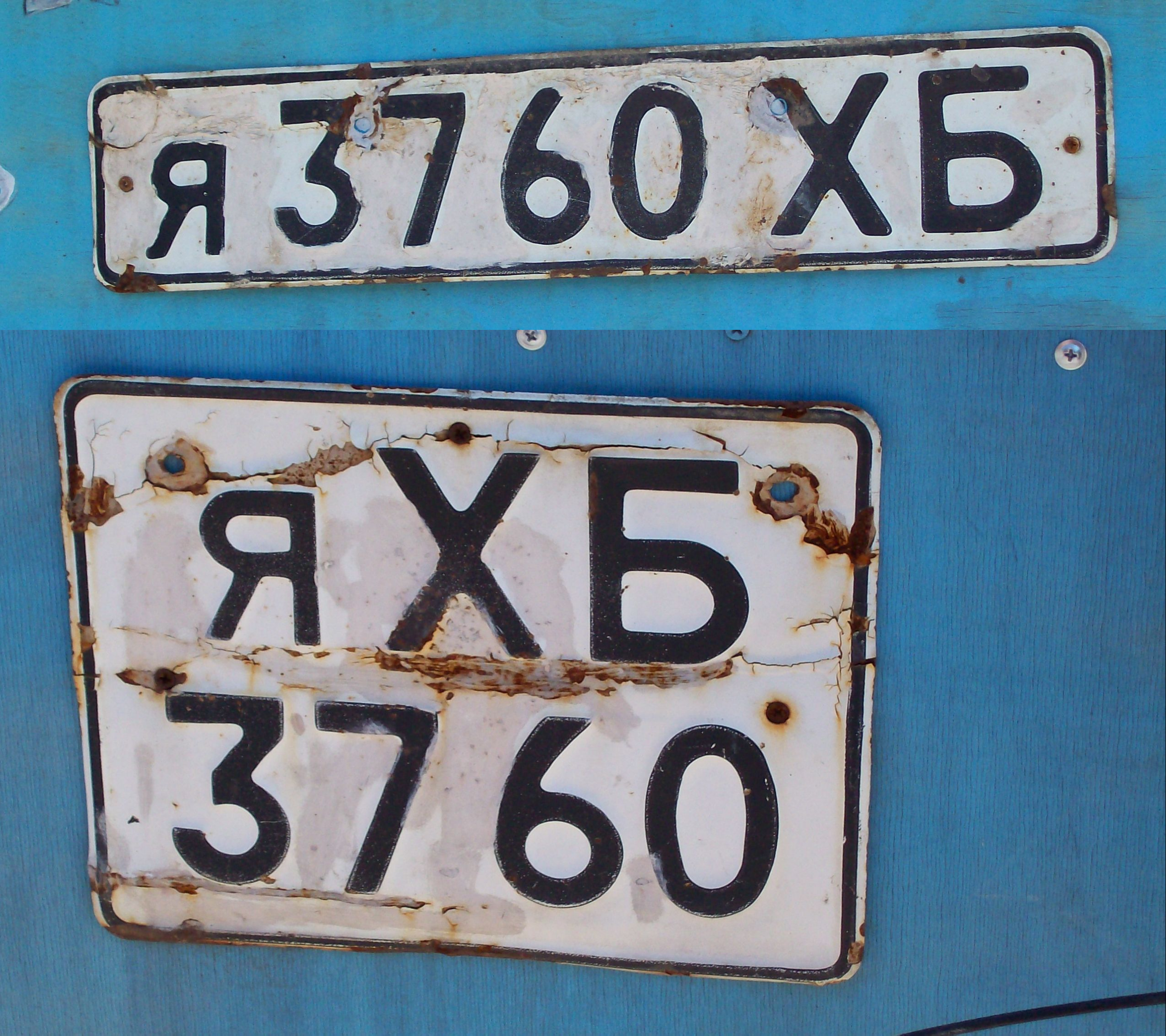
яХБ license plates, front and rear, for Japanese cars, Khabarovsk Krai, 1992-1994

=== After dissolution ===
Since 1990, the former constituent republics of the USSR have begun using Soviet-style plates while adding a "national flavor" to them. For example, those of Ukraine added the letter I to their serials, and in Latvia, Lithuania, Estonia and Kyrgyzstan the Cyrillic letters have been replaced by Latin ones. "National" license plates have also appeared even in Tatarstan and in Chechnya.

In the Russian Federation, replacing the license plate of the Soviet-style began in 1993, but was not compulsory. Thus, in a few former-USSR countries (mainly in Russia, Belarus and Ukraine), vehicles bearing 1980-format or even 1959-format plates could still be found, while in other countries (such as the Baltic states and Moldova), these plates are considered invalid and could only be found on unused equipment.

The Soviet period has left substantial influence in license plates. Thus, in most ex-USSR republics, such as Armenia, Georgia, military plates have black backgrounds, diplomatic plates have red back grounds, and plates for foreigners have light-orange background color.

Russia almost entirely borrowed the codes for diplomatic plates from the USSR, and Kazakhstan continued the practice of coding regions on light-orange plates until 2012. Trailer and motorcycle plates in Armenia followed the Soviet format until 2010, and until 2012 or 2013 in Turkmenistan. Tractor trailers' registration ceased to follow the Soviet pattern in Uzbekistan only after February to March 2015. Plates in Mongolia followed the format of Soviet styles up until this day.

Vehicle registration plates of Russia, format since 1993

Vehicle registration plates of Belarus, format since 2004

Vehicle registration plates of Azerbaijan, format since 2011

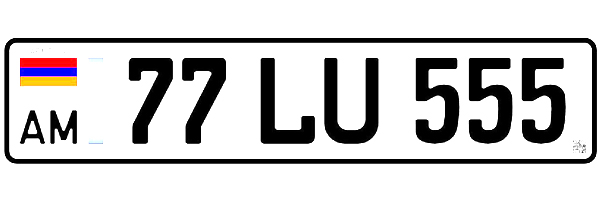
Vehicle registration plates of Armenia, format since 2014

Vehicle registration plates of Moldova, format since 2015

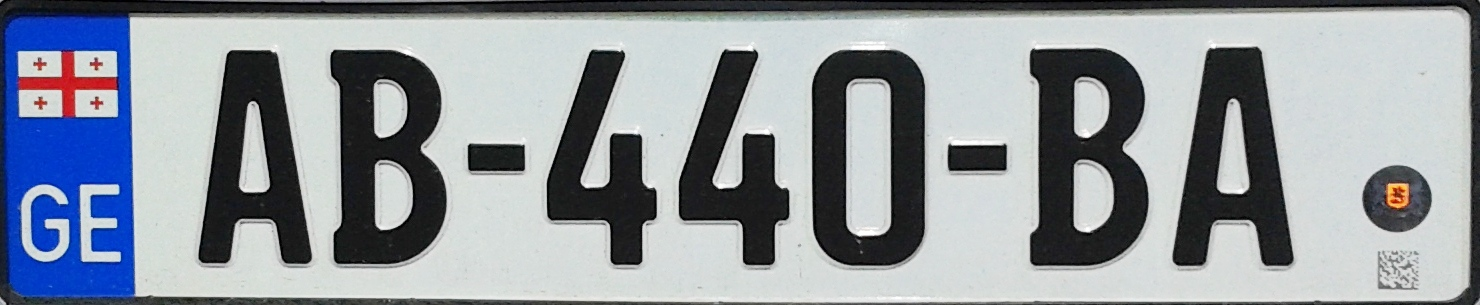
Vehicle registration plates of Georgia, format since 2014

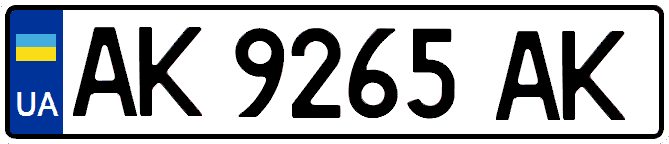
Vehicle registration plates of Ukraine, format since 2015

Vehicle registration plates of Estonia, format since 2004

Vehicle registration plates of Latvia, format since 2004

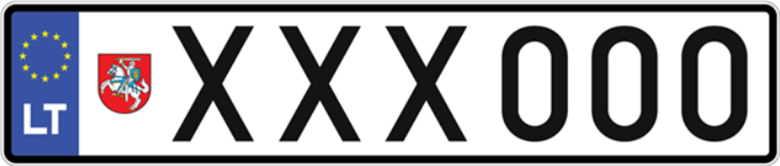
Vehicle registration plates of Lithuania, format since 2023

Vehicle registration plates of Kazakhstan, format since 2012

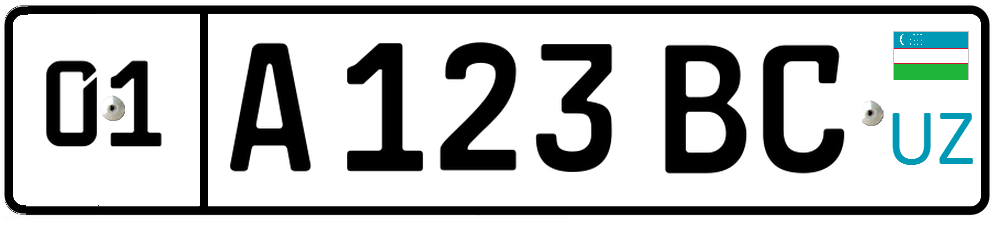
Vehicle registration plates of Uzbekistan, format since 2008

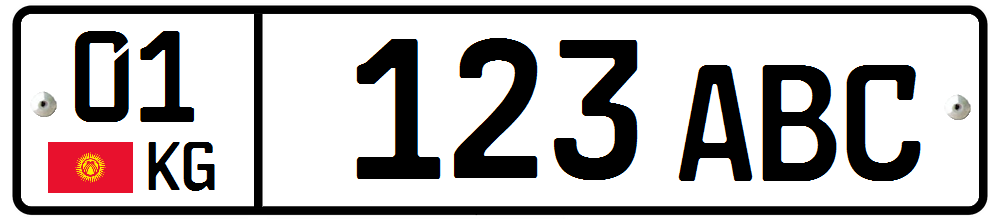
Vehicle registration plates of Kyrgyzstan, format since 2016

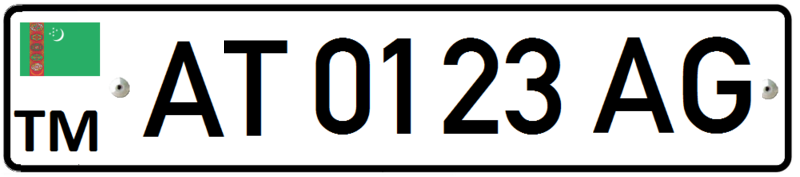
Vehicle registration plates of Turkmenistan, format since 2009

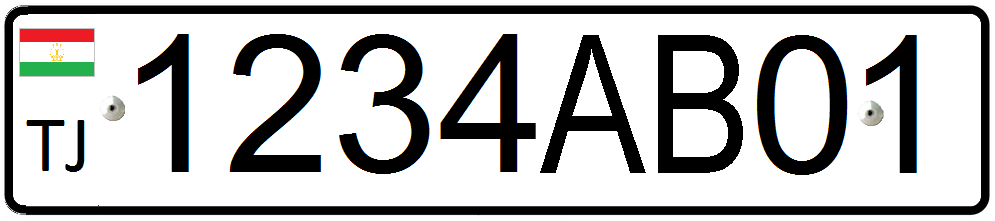
Vehicle registration plates of Tajikistan, format since 2014

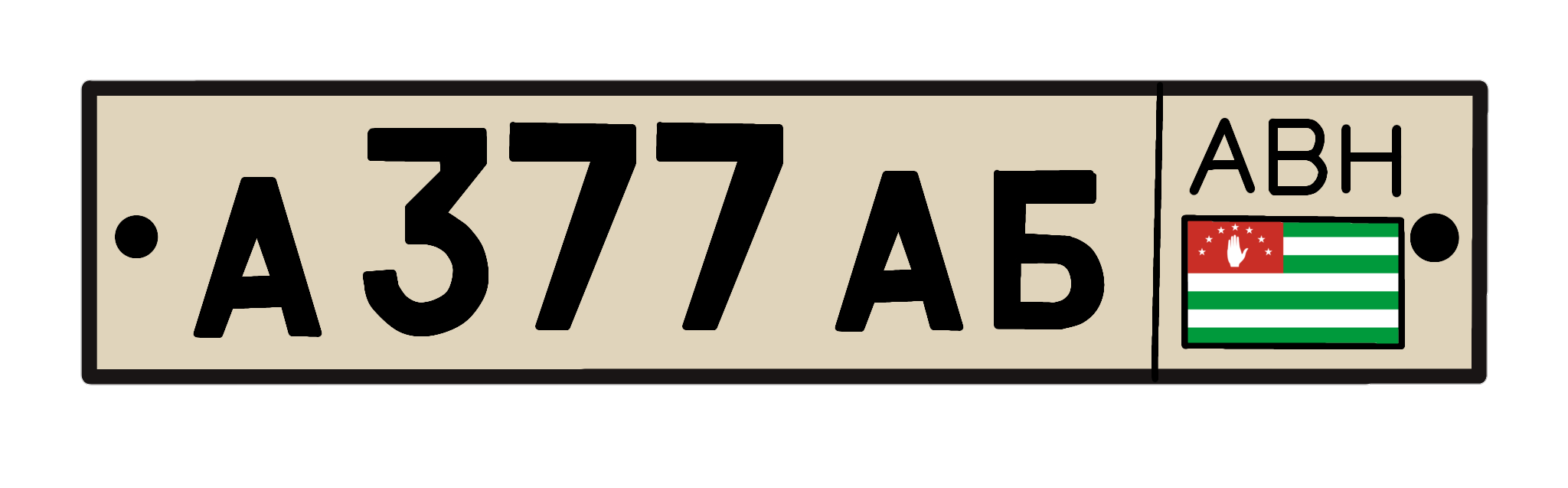
Vehicle registration plates of Abkhazia, format since 2006

Vehicle registration plates of South Ossetia, format since 2006

Vehicle registration plates of Transnistria, format since the end of the 1990s

Vehicle registration plates of the Donetsk People's Republic, format in 2015-2022

Vehicle registration plates of the Luhansk People's Republic, format in 2016-2022

== Index of registration codes ==
=== Civilian vehicles ===
Below is an explanation of alphanumeric codes, used in the USSR and post-Soviet civilian license plates for the 1934 format, 1936 (GOST 3207-36), 1946 (GOST 3207-46), 1959 (GOST 3207-58) and 1980 formats (GOST 3207-77). Regions with dates below are those that no longer exist.

Registration codes
Region within the USSR	1934	1936	1946	1959				1980				
Region within the USSR	1934	1936	1946	Automobiles	Trailers	Tractors	Tractor Trailers	Automobiles	Trailers	Tractors	Tractor Trailers	Foreigner area code
Armenian SSR
General series	АРМЕНИЯ	АР, АФ	АО, АП, АР, АШ, ДЯ, ПШ	АР, АД	АП, АР	АР, АТ	-	АД, АР	АП, АР, (ЯЭ), (ЯЮ)	-	-	676
Azerbaijan SSR
General series	БАКУ	АЖ, АЗ, АИ, АК	АЛ, АМ, АН, АФ, АХ, ВФ, ИУ	АЗ, АГ, АЖ, АВ	АЗ, АУ	-	-	АГ, АЗ, АЖ	АЗ, АУ, (ЗБ), (ЗВ)	АЧ, АЩ, ФУ	АУ, ФУ	675
Baku	-	-	АК, АУ, АЧ, ВХ, ЯЦ	-	-	-	-	-	-	-	-	-
Nagorno-Karabakh	-	-	-	-	-	-	-	НК (Note: This series began to be issued only after the independence self-proclamation of the republic and continued to be issued until introduction of Armenia new registrations in 1996. For private cars рНК series was used, and НКР used for state cars.)	-	-	-	675 АзССР
Estonian SSR
General series	-	ER, ЭТ	РР, РС, РТ, РУ, РФ, РХ	ЭС, ЕА	ЭС, ЭТ, ЕА, ЕЕ, ЕН	ЭЯ, ЕА, ЕВ, ЕЕ, ЕС, ЕТ, ЕХ, ЭК, ОВ	ЕВ, ЕК, ЭА, [ЭК], ЭН	ЕА, ЭСТ (Note: The serie was issued only for Estonian SSR state cars)	ЕА, ЭС, ЭР, ЭТ, ЭУ, (ЭО)	ЕЕ, ЕМ, ЕН, ЕО, ЕС, ЕТ, ЕХ, ЭК, ЭР	ЕР, ЭЯ	681
Byelorussian SSR
General series	БССР	БР…БЧ, НЛ, НМ, ОГ, ОД, ОЗ	-	-	-	-	-	-	-	[БЯ]	-	-
Baranavichy Voblast 04.12.1939—08.01.1954	-	?	БЖ	-	-	-	-	-	-	-	-	-
Belastok Voblast 04.12.1939—20.09.1944	-	ОГ	-	-	-	-	-	-	-	-	-	-
Bobruysk Voblast 20.09.1944—08.01.1954	-	?	БЗ	-	-	-	-	-	-	-	-	-
Brest Voblast	-	ОЗ	БИ, БЭ	БН	БН, БО	-	-	БН, {МИМ}	БН, БО	БЭ	-	596
Vitebsk Voblast	-	?	БК, БЮ	ВТ	ВТ, ВУ	-	-	ВТ	ВТ, ВУ	ВМ	БЮ, БХ	597
Gomel Voblast	-	?	БЛ, ЖР	ГС	ГМ, ГС, ГТ	-	-	ГС	ГС, ГТ, ГМ	ВЦ, ГБ, ГТ, ГЮ, ГА	БЯ, ГА, ГЮ	598
Grodno Voblast	-	?	БМ, ЖС	ГК	ГК, ГЛ	-	-	ГК	ГК, ГЛ, (ЖГ)	БЧ, ГВ, ГЖ	ШЧ, ГГ, ГЖ	599
Minsk	-	?	БН, БО, ЖТ	МИ	МЖ, ТМ, МИ	-	-	МИ	МИ, МЖ, ЖМ, ЖН, ЖВ, ЖГ	ДШ, ДЭ, МА, МВ, МЮ, МЖ	МЖ, МЮ	600
Minsk Voblast	-	?	БП, БР, ЖУ	МБ	МБ, МЛ, ТМ	-	-	МБ	МБ, МЛ, ЖО, НТ, (БД), (БЗ)	-	БШ	601
Mogilev Voblast	-	?	БС, БЯ	МГ	МГ, МЯ	-	-	МГ	МГ, МХ, (ЯГ), (ЯД)	-	-	602
Maladzyechna Voblast 04.12.1939—20.01.1960	-	?	БТ, БЩ	МЛ	-	-	-	-	-	-	-	-
Pinsk Voblast 04.12.1939—08.01.1954	-	?	БУ	-	-	-	-	-	-	-	-	-
Polesia Voblast 15.01.1938—08.01.1954	-	?	БФ	-	-	-	-	-	-	-	-	-
Polatsk Voblast 20.09.1944—08.01.1954	-	?	БЧ	-	-	-	-	-	-	-	-	-
Georgian SSR
General series	ГРУЗИЯ	ГР…ГФ	ГИ…ГП, ГФ…ГШ, ГЮ, ПП, ПР	ГР, ГА, ГГ, ГД	ГР, ГП	ГК, ГЛ, ГН, ШЦ, ШЭ, ШЮ	[ШЮ]	ГА, ГР, ГГ, (ГД), (ГЕ), (ГЗ)	ГВ, ГГ, ГЖ, ГЗ, ГП, ГР, ГЧ	ГЛ, ГР, ЮЦ	ГР, ГЛ	677
Abkhaz SSR	АБХАЗИЯ	ГА	-	-	-	-	-	АИ (Note: This serie was reserved for the republic, but began to be issued only after the self-proclamation of independence of Abkhazia and continued to be issued until the introduction of its own license plates.)	АИ, (ЗИ)	-	-	694
Ajdarian ASSR	-	-	-	-	-	-	-	(АЯ) (Note: This serie was reserved for the republic, but was never issued due to the refuse of Georgian authorities.)	(ЖР)	-	-	695
South Ossetian Autonomous Oblast	-	-	-	-	-	-	-	ЮО (Note: This serie began to be issued only after the independence self-proclamation of the republic and continued to be issued until the introduction of its own license plates. For private cars, рЮО was used, ЮОР used for state cars.)	ЮО	-	-	677 ГССР
Kazakh SSR
Akmola Region	-	-	ШБ, ШШ, ДП, ДЮ	АК	АК, АЕ	-	-	АК, ЦЛ	АК, (ЦЖ), (ЦЗ)	ЦА, ЦБ	ЦА	621
Aktobe Region	-	КБ	ША, ШЭ, ПЭ	АЮ	АЮ, АЯ	-	-	АЮ	АЮ, АЯ	-	-	605
Alma-Ata	-	КА, ЩА	-	АТ	АИ, АТ, АЦ	-	-	АТ	АИ, АТ, АЦ	-	ЯЦ	603
Alma-Ata Region	-	КА, ЩА	ШВ, ШГ, ШД, ДТ, ЯМ	АП	АО	ШГ	-	АП	АО, (ЕД), (ЕЗ)	АК	АК	604
East Kazakhstan Region	-	КВ	ШЕ, ШХ, ДС, ЭЩ	ВК	ВА, ВК	ШХ, ЖМ, ХВ	ЖМ	ВА, ВК	ВК, (ВЗ)	ВП	ВП	606
Gur'yev Region	-	-	ШЖ, ДУ	ГУ	ГЕ, ГУ	ШЖ	-	ГТ, ША	ГЕ, ГУ	-	-	607
Jambyl Region	-	-	ШЗ, ДФ	ДЖ	ДБ, ДЖ	-	-	ДЖ	ДБ, ДЖ	[ЕИ], ЖВ, ЖН	ЖВ	608
Dzhezkazgan Oblast 20.03.1973—23.05.1997	-	-	-	ДК	ДЗ	-	-	ДК	ДЗ	-	-	609
West Kazakhstan Region	-	КЗ	ШИ, ДР	ЗК	ЗК, ЗН	-	-	УТ	ЗН, (ЗК)	УБ	-	620
Karaganda Region	-	КГ	ШК, ШЛ, ДХ, ИШ, ЖЛ	КГ	КГ, ДВ	ШП	-	КГ	КГ, ДВ, (ДЦ), (ДЧ)	ЕЛ, ЖГ	ЕЛ	610
Kyzylorda Region	-	-	ШМ	КЗ	КЗ, ДИ	-	-	КЗ	КЗ, ДИ	-	-	611
Kokshetau Oblast 16.03.1944—23.05.1997	-	-	ШН, ШЯ, ДЦ, ДМ	КТ	КТ, ЧЭ	-	-	КТ	КТ, ЧЭ	-	-	612
Kostanay Region	-	-	ШО, ШЧ, ДЧ, ДЩ, ДЭ, ЯИ	КЩ	КЩ, ШН, ШО, ШЧ, ШФ	ХБ, ХФ	-	НЖ	НЖ, НЗ, НЛ, (ТП), ШЧ, ШН	-	-	613
Mangystau Region	-	-	-	МШ	МШ	-	-	МШ	МШ	-	-	614
Pavlodar Region	-	-	ШР, ШЮ, ДШ, ПХ	ПА	ПА, ПВ	-	-	ПА	ПА, ПВ, ПФ, (ПЦ)	-	ПД	615
North Kazakhstan Region	-	КС	ШТ, ШЩ, ЯТ	СК	СЗ, СК	-	-	СК	СК, (СЗ)	ЖЗ	-	616
Semipalatinsk Region 14.10.1939—23.05.1997	-	-	ШС, РЭ	СП	СП, СЮ	-	-	СП	СП, СЮ	СП	СУ	617
Taldy-Kurgan Region 16.03.1944—06.06.1959 23.12.1967—23.05.1997	-	-	ШУ, РЩ	ТК	ТК, ТЛ	-	-	ТК	ТК, (ТЛ)	ТН	ТН	618
Torgay Region 23.11.1970—02.06.1988 08.1990—23.05.1997	-	-	-	ТГ	ТП	-	-	ТГ	-	ТП	-	619
South Kazakhstan Region	-	КЮ	ШФ, ШЦ, ЯФ	ЮК	ЮК, ЮН	[ЮК]	[ЮК]	ЧМ	ЮК, ЮН, (ЮЦ), (ЮЧ)	-	-	622
Kirghiz SSR
General series	-	РК, РЛ	-	-	-	-	-	-	-	-	-	-
Bishkek from 05.02.1991	-	-	-	-	-	-	-	БИ	-	-	-	623
Jalal-Abad Region	-	-	ЦА	-	-	-	-	ЖА	ЖЛ	-	-	692
Issyk-Kul Region	-	-	ЦБ	ИК	ИК, ИС	-	-	ИК	ИК	-	-	624
Naryn Region	-	-	ЦЕ	ТЯ, НР	ТЯ, НР	-	-	НР	НФ	-	-	625
Osh Region	-	-	ЦВ, ЦГ	ОШ	ОШ	ЦГ	-	ОШ	ОШ, (ШК), (ШС)	-	-	626
Talas Region	-	-	ЦД	-	-	-	-	ТФ	ФБ	-	-	682
Frunze 27.01.1959—14.12.1990	-	-	-	ТЯ, ФИ	ТЯ, ФЗ, ФИ	-	УЖ	ФИ	ФИ, ФЗ, ФП, ТЯ	ТШ, УЖ, ФЗ, ФО	ЦВ	623
Chuy Region 21.11.1939—27.01.1959 from 14.12.1990	-	-	ЦЖ, ЦЗ, ЦИ	-	-	-	-	ЧС	ЧД, (ЧЮ)	-	-	693
Latvian SSR
General series	-	RL, ЛР, ЛЦ, МЖ, МЗ	ЛО, ЛП, ЛЦ, ЛМ, ЛФ, ЛХ, ЛР, ЛЯ, ОГ	ЛА, ЛТ	ЛА, ЛК, ЛЛ, ЛМ	ЛЕ, ЛЖ, ЛН, ЛО, ЛП, ЛР, ЛФ, ЛЯ	-	ЛТ, ЛА	ЛА, ЛК, ЛЛ, ЛМ, (ША), (ШБ)	ЗЗ, ЛК, ЛЯ, ЮЛ, ЛН	ЛК, ЛФ, ЮЛ	678
Traveling series	-	-	-	-	-	-	-	НЕ	-	-	-	-
Lithuanian SSR
General series	-	RL, ЛЛ	ЛС, ЛТ, ЛУ, ЛЧ, ЛШ, ЛЭ, ЛЩ, ЛЮ, ЛЛ	ЛИ, ЛЛ, ЛК	ЛИ, ЛТ, ЛЦ, ЛЧ, ЛШ	ЛИ, ЛС, ЛУ, ЛЧ, ЛШ, ТД, ТЕ, ТК, ТЛ, ТС, ТХ	-	ЛИ, ЛК, (ЛЛ)	ЛИ, ЛЦ, ЛЧ, ЛШ	ЛД, ЛЕ, ЛЖ, ЛТ, ЛХ, ЛЦ	ЛИ	679, 690, 691
Traveling series	-	-	-	-	-	-	-	НX	-	-	-	-
Moldavian SSR
General series	-	?	МШ, МЭ, РЛ, РМ, РН	МД, МВ	МД, МЕ, МЭ, МЩ	МД, МЖ, МС, МШ, МЭ, РН	-	МВ, МД	МД, МЕ, МЭ, ЖА, ЖБ, (ЖЗ)	МП, МХ, МЭ, РН, ЛЧ, МШ, МЯ	МШ	680
Transnistrian SSR	-	-	-	-	-	-	-	МП (Note: This series began to be issued only after the independence self-proclamation of the republic and continued to be issued until introduction of its own license plates.)	ПБ	-	-	680 МССР
Russian SFSR
Adyghe Republic From 1990	-	-	-	-	-	-	-	АФ	-	ЖА	-	696
Azov-Black Sea Krai 10.01.1934—13.09.1937	АЗОВ-ЧЕР	АЧ	-	-	-	-	-	-	-	-	-	-
Altai Krai	-	АЛ, АН, АО, ЭА	АА...АГ, АЦ, ВШ, ВЯ, НЩ, НЭ, НЮ, НЦ	АЛ, АБ	АА, АЛ, АБ	АВ, АЕ, АЦ, АЮ, НЩ	АБ, АВ, АГ, АЦ	АБ, АЛ	АА, АБ, АЛ, АЧ, БЭ, (БЮ)	АО, АШ, АЭ, АЮ, ЗЯ, ШЩ	АА, АЕ, АЛ, АУ, АЭ, ЗЯ	542
Amur Oblast	-	-	АС, АТ, ДВ, ЖЯ	АМ	АМ, АФ	АА, АМ	АА, АБ, АМ	АМ	АМ, АФ, АЭ	АМ, АТ	АТ	548
Arzamas Oblast 07.01.1954—23.04.1957	-	-	ОП	-	-	-	-	-	-	-	-	-
Arkhangelsk Oblast	-	СР	АД, АЕ, АЖ	АХ	АХ, (АГ)^{[a 5]}	АБ, АР, АХ	-	АХ	АХ, АГ	АР, АД	АД	549
Astrakhan Oblast	-	-	АЗ, АИ	АС	АД, АС	-	-	АС	АД, АС	-	-	550
Balashov Oblast 06.01.1954—19.11.1957	-	-	ОС, ОТ	-	-	-	-	-	-	-	-	-
Bashkir ASSR	БАШКИРИЯ	БА, ББ, БВ	БВ, БГ, БХ, БШ, ДГ, ДИ, ДН, ДО	БА, БШ	БА, БВ	БШ, БФ, БТ, БК	БЗ	БА, БШ, ББ	БА, ББ, БВ, БГ, ОА	БА, БС, БТ, БФ, ШЯ, ШД, ЩЯ, БЗ	БС, БК	526
Belgorod Oblast	-	-	ОУ, ОФ	БЕ, БЛ	БЕ, БК	БГ, БД, БЕ, БК, БЛ, БМ, ЦТ	БГ, БЛ, БМ	БЕ	БЕ, БК	БО, БЦ, БД, ББ, БЛ	БО, БЛ	551
Bryansk Oblast	-	-	БА, ББ, БЦ, ЗП	БР	БР, БС	БР	БР	БР	БР, БС	-	БР	552
Buryat ASSR	БУР.МОНГ.	БМ	БД, БЕ, ВЭ	БУ	БУ, БТ	-	-	БУ	БТ, (БУ)	-	-	527
Belikoluk Oblast 22.08.1944—02.10.1957	-	-	ВА, ВИ	-	-	-	-	-	-	-	-	-
Vladimir Oblast	-	ВД	ВБ, ВЖ, ВЗ, ВУ	ВЛ	ВЛ, ВМ	ВИ, ВМ	-	ВЛ	ВЛ, ВМ	ВБ, ВК, ВЛ, ШВ	ВБ, ШВ	553
Volgograd Oblast	СТАЛ-ГРАД, СТАЛИН.КР.	СТ, СУ, СХ	СУ, СФ, СЭ, ДД	СГ, ВД,	СГ, СЩ, ВЯ	ВБ, ВП	-	ВД, ВХ	ВО, ВЯ, УС, УТ	ВП...ВХ, ВЧ, ВЩ, ВЭ	ВЭ	554
Vologda Oblast	-	ВА	ВВ, ВО, ВС, ЖШ	ВО	ВО, ВД	ВЖ, ВО	ВВ	ВО	ВФ, ВД, ВЭ, (ВЮ)	ВВ, ВО, ШО, ВУ, ВЗ	ВО, ВУ, ВЗ, ШВ	555
Voronezh Oblast	ВОРОНЕЖ	ВО, ВП, ВР, ВЧ	ВГ, ВД, ВЕ, ВП, ВР, ДЗ	ВВ, ВЖ	ВВ, ВЖ	ВД, ВУ, ВЕ, ЦС, ЧО	ВГ, ВЖ, ВЧ	ВВ, (ВЖ)	ВВ, ВЖ, ЖЭ, ЖЮ	ВУ	ВГ	556
East-Siberian Krai 30.07.1930—05.12.1936 East-Siberian Oblast05.12.1936—26.09.1937	В.СИБИРЬ	ВС, ВТ	-	-	-	-	-	-	-	-	-	-
Gorno-Altai Autonomous OblastFrom 1990	-	-	-	-	-	-	-	ГЛ, ГЯ	ГЯ	-	-	542 Алтайский край
Gorky	-	-	ГА, ГБ, ГВ, ГД	-	-	-	-	-	-	-	-	-
Gorky Oblast	ГОРЬКИЙ	ГК, ГЛ, ГМ	АЩ...АЯ, ГГ, НЧ, ЛН	ГО, ГВ	ГА, ГГ, ГО, ГВ, ГН	АЭ, ГК, ГН, ГА	ГО, ГР	ГО, (ГВ)	ГО, ГН, ГА, ГХ, ГТ	ГО, ГТ, НЖ, ГЩ, ГЭ, ШК, АЧ, НШ, ЮЮ	АЧ, ГЭ, НШ	557
Dagestan ASSR	ДАГЕСТАН	?	ДА, ДБ, ЯЩ	ДА	ДА, ДГ	[ДА]	[ДА]	ДА	ДА	ДА, ГХ	ДА	528
Far-East Krai 04.01.1926—20.10.1938	ДВК	ДА, ДВ	-	-	-	-	-	-	-	-	-	-
Jewish Autonomous OblastС 1990 года	-	-	-	-	-	-	-	ЕЯ	-	-	-	699
Zapad Oblast 01.10.1929—27.09.1937	ЗАПАД	ЗА	-	-	-	-	-	-	-	-	-	-
Zapad-Siberian Krai 30.07.1930—28.09.1937	З.СИБИРЬ	ЗС	-	-	-	-	-	-	-	-	-	-
Ivanov Oblast	ИВАНОВО	ИВ, ИГ, ИД	ИА, ИБ, ИВ	ИВ	ИВ, ИО	ИВ	-	ИВ	ИВ, ИО	ИВ, ИА	ИА	558
Ingush Republic	-	-	-	-	-	-	-	(ИН)	-	-	-	539 ЧИ АССР
Irkut Oblast	-	ВС, ВТ, [ВУ]	ИГ...ИЗ, ИЩ, ИЭ, ИЮ	ИР, ИС	ИР, ИТ, ИУ, ИФ	-	-	ИР, (ИС)	ИР, ИТ, ИУ, ИФ, ИХ, РЕ	ИД, ИЗ, ЮН	-	559
Kabardino-Balkar ASSR	-	РБ	ХС, ХТ	КБ	КБ, ХС	-	-	КБ	КБ, (ХС)	КЯ, ХХ	ХХ	529
Kazak ASSR15.06.1925—05.12.1936	КАЗАКСТАН	КА	-	-	-	-	-	-	-	-	-	-
Kaliningrad Oblast	-	-	КЕ, ВК, ВЛ	КЛ	КЛ, ВГ	КА, КЕ, КК	-	КЛ	КЛ, ВГ, (ДТ), (ОН)	ИЛ	АУ	560
Kalinin Oblast	КАЛИНИН	КЛ, КМ	КЗ, КИ, ДК, ДЛ, ПЦ	КА	КА, ДС, ДТ	КИ, КЛ, КО, ЖО	КВ, КН, КО	КА	КА, ДС	ИФ, ИХ, КН, КО	КН, КО	561
Kalmyts ASSR	-	КЦ	-	КЦ	КЦ, ЦК	-	-	КЦ	КЦ, ЦК, (ЦИ)	КМ	КМ	530
Kaluga Oblast	-	ДН	КК, ИЛ, ИМ	КЖ	КЖ, ИЛ, ИЗ	КМ, КС, ЖЯ	КЖ, КК, КС, ЖЯ	КЖ	КЖ, (ИЛ), (ИЗ)	КЖ, КК	АЗ, КК	562
Kamensk Oblast 06.01.1954—19.11.1957	-	-	ОХ, ОЦ	-	-	-	-	-	-	-	-	-
Kamchatka Oblast	-	-	ЯП	КЧ	КЧ, ЧА	-	-	КЧ	КЧ, ЧА	-	-	563
Karel ASSR	КАРЕЛИЯ	ЛК	КО, КУ, НШ	КС	КС, НШ	-	-	КС, {фЛК}^{[a 6]}	КС, НШ	ЭЛ	-	531
Kemerov Oblast	-	[ВЖ]^{[a 7]}, [ЕЖ], КП	КТ, КЦ, ИИ, ИК, ИН, ЖЦ	КЕ, ЦХ	КЕ, ИИ, ИМ	ЕМ, КТ	-	КЕ, ЦХ	КЕ, ИИ, ИМ, ИП	КА, КЛ, КТ, ЦФ	КА, КЛ	564
Kirgiz SSR01.02.1926—05.12.1936	КИРГИЗИЯ	-	-	-	-	-	-	-	-	-	-	-
Kirov Oblast	КИРОВ	КИ, ИК	КН, КШ, ИС, ИТ, ЕШ	КВ	КВ, ИА, ИН	КБ, КИ, КЩ, ЖИ, ЖЗ	-	КВ	КВ, ИА, ИН	КИ, КН, КЩ, ЦУ, ПЯ, [ХЭ]	ИН, КН, КШ, КЩ	565
Komi ASSR	-	ОА	ХП, ХФ, ХШ	КМ	КМ, ХП	КП	-	КМ	КМ, (ХП)	ГЗ, КП	КП	532, 684-686
Kostroma Oblast	-	ДП	КП, ИФ, ИХ	КО	КО	-	-	КО	КО, ИС	ЛЩ	КЦ	566
Krasnodarsk Krai	-	КЧ, КШ	КА, КБ, КВ, КГ, ЦО, ЦП, ЦЦ, ЦЭ, ЦЮ, ЦЯ, ЦК, ЭЮ	КК, ЦП, ЦВ	КК, ЦН, ЦО, ЦП, ЦВ	КВ, ЖА, ЖБ, ЖЖ	ЖА	КК, ЦП, ЦВ	КК, ЦН, ЦО, ЦП, ЦВ, ЦГ, ЦТ, (ЦЕ)	КБ, КГ, КО, ЦТ, ЮХ, ГШ	ГШ	543, 700
Krasnoyarsk Krai	КРАС-ЯРСК	КР, КЭ, ЭЛ	ВЮ, КД, КЖ, КЛ, КЮ, ЦФ, ЦХ, ЦЩ, ВЩ, ЖЧ, ЖЩ	КЯ, КЭ, {КАЯ}	КЮ, КЯ, ЦХ, ЦЦ, ЕХ	КМ, ЦЭ	-	КЭ, КЯ	КЮ, КЯ, ЦХ, ЦЦ, ЦЧ, ЦШ	КЭ, КЮ, ШЕ, ШЖ	-	544
Kuybyshev	-	-	ВМ, ВН, ВТ	-	-	-	-	-	-	-	-	-
Kuybushev Oblast	КУЙБЫШЕВ	ВК, ВЛ, ВМ, ВН	КР, КС, КЩ, ИО, ИП, ИР	КШ, УК	КШ, ВБ, ВЕ	КР	ГЧ	КШ, УК	КШ, ВЕ, ВБ, ЕЭ, ЕЮ	-	-	567
Kurgan Oblast	-	?^{[a 8]}	КФ, КЭ, ИЦ, ИЧ	КН	КН, КЭ	КУ, ЦХ	КГ	КН	КН, КЭ, УО	КФ	ЮО	568
Kursk Oblast	КУРСК	КО, ОК, ИО	КХ, КЧ, ЦТ, ЦУ, ЦШ, ПЩ	КУ	КУ, РС	КХ, КЧ, ЦУ, ЦФ	КР	КУ	КУ, РС, (РЦ), (РЧ)	ИИ	КГ, КХ, КЧ	569
Leningrad	ЛЕН-ГРАД	ЛА...ЛИ	ЛА...ЛК, ЛН	ЛЕ, ЛД, ЛО	ЛГ, ЛД, ЛЕ, ЛЖ, ЛЗ	ЧМ, ЧР	-	ЛД, ЛЕ, СР	ЛГ, ЛД, ЛЕ, ЛЖ, ЛЗ, УХ	ЩБ, ЧМ, ЧР, ЧЗ, ЮЧ	ЧЗ	570, 687-689
Leningrad Oblast	ЛЕН-ГРАД	ЛО...ЛТ	ЗИ...ЗН, ЗР	ЛО	ЛН, ЛО, ЛР, ЛЮ	ЛБ, ЛВ, ЛГ	ЛБ	ЛО, ЛГ, СР	ЛН, ЛО, ЛР, ЛЭ	ЛВ, ЛГ, ЛО	ЛГ	570, 687-689
Lipetsk Oblast	-	-	ОЧ, ОШ	ЛП	ЛП, ЛЯ	ЛТ, ЛЦ	ЛП, ЛТ, ЛЦ	ЛП	ЛП, ЛЯ	ДИ, ЛИ, ЛТ	ЛТ, ЛИ, ЛЦ	571
Magadan Oblast	-	-	ЯК, ЯН, ЯО	МА	МА, МН	-	-	МА	УГ, МФ	МГ	-	572
Mari ASSR	-	МЦ	МЦ, ХЦ	МС	МС, МЦ	-	-	МС	МС, (МЦ)	МУ, МЦ	-	533
Molotov	-	-	МС, МТ	-	-	-	-	-	-	-	-	-
Mordov ASSR	[МОРДОВИЯ]	МЯ	МЧ, ХЧ	МР	МР, МЧ	-	МЛ	МР	МЧ	МН, МЧ	МН	534
Moscow	МОСКВА	МА...МИ, МЛ	МА…МР, МУ, МЩ, МЮ, МЯ, ЭА, ЭВ…ЭП	МО, МК, ММ, МН, МТ, {МАC}	МО, МК, МВ, МЗ, ММ, МП, МТ, МЮ, МХ, НВ	ЧХ	-	МО, МК, ММ, МН, МТ, {МАС}, {ЕАТ}	МВ, ММ, МО,^{[a 9]}МЗ, МК, МП, МТ, МЮ, МЯ, ЭА...ЭК, ОО	ВЯ, МТ	ММ	501-520
Moscow Oblast	МОСКВА	МН...МС, МФ, МХ	ЮА…ЮЯ	ЮА, ЮМ, ЮБ, ЮВ, ЮГ, МЕ	ЮА...ЮЗ, ОА	МЗ, МВ, МА, МО, МК	МА, МБ, МВ	МЖ, МЕ, МЗ, МЛ, {МОМ}, {ЕАХ}	МА, ЮА...ЮИ, ЮЛ, ЮМ, ЮП, ЮР, ЮС, УК	МВ, МЗ, МО, ЩВ, ЩЛ, ЯФ, ОЯ, МЮ	МО, МЗ	521-525
Murmansk Oblast	-	МЮ, ЭД	МФ, МХ	МУ	МУ, МФ	МУ, МФ	МП	МУ	МН, МУ, (УА), (УБ)	МФ	МП, МФ	573
Nemtsev-Povolzhya ASSR 19.10.1918—28.08.1941	[Н-ПОВОЛЖЬЯ]	НП	-	-	-	-	-	-	-	-	-	-
Novgorod Oblast	-	НВ	НА, НО, НС	НО	НО, НП	НБ, НВ, НЕ, НО	НВ, НА, НГ	НО	НО, НП	НБ, НЕ	НЕ, ЧК	574
Novosibirsk	-	-	НБ, НВ, ОН, НР	-	-	-	-	-	-	-	-	-
Novosibirsk Oblast	-	ЗТ, ЗУ	ОК, ОЛ, ОМ, ЖН	НС, НБ	НБ, НГ, НД, НС	НА, [НГ], НЛ, [НС]	НА, НМ	НБ, НС	НС, НГ, НД, НУ, НЦ	НД, НГ, НЛ, НМ, НН	НЛ, НС	575
Obsko-Irtysh Oblast 17.01.1934—07.12.1934	ОБЬ-ИРТЫШ	-	-	-	-	-	-	-	-	-	-	-
Omsk	-	-	ОА, ОБ, ОВ	-	-	-	-	-	-	-	-	-
Omsk Oblast	ОМСК	ОМ, ОН, ОП	ЕР, ЕС, ЕЩ, ЕЯ, ЯБ	ОМ	ОК, ОЛ, ОМ	ОС, ОА, ОН	ОБ, ОН, ОС	ОМ	ОИ, ОК, ОЛ, ОМ	ОВ, ОЕ, ОН, ОР, ОС, ЧК, ЦЭ, ОЩ, ША	ОЩ, АФ, ША, ОР	576
Orenburg Oblast	ОРЕНБУРГ	ОР, ОС, ОТ	ЧК, ЧЛ, ЧМ, ЧЦ, ЧШ, ЧЩ	ОБ, ОГ	ОБ, ОВ, ОЗ	ОШ	-	ОБ, {дОА}	ОБ, ОВ, ОЗ, ОЦ, (ОЧ)	ОВ, ОЛ	ОГ, ОЛ	578
Oryol Oblast	-	ОЦ	ОД, ОЕ, ОЖ	ОР	ОР, ОС	ОР	ОВ	ОР	ОР, ОЖ, (ОУ), (ОФ)	ОВ, ОД, ОР, ШЗ	ОД	577
Penza Oblast	-	?	ПЕ, ПЖ, ПМ, ПН	ПЕ	ПЕ, ПН	ПН	-	ПЕ	ПЕ, ПН, ПД	ПН, ПМ, НШ, ЮЕ	ПА, ПН, ШД	579
Perm Oblast	-	ПА, ПБ	НИ...НН, НХ, ПО, ЦМ	ПМ, ПТ	ПЛ, ПМ	ПД, ПК	ПГ, ПР	ПМ, ПТ	ПМ, ПЛ, ПЗ	ПК, ПУ, ПГ, ШЮ	ПУ, ШК	580
Primorsky Krai	-	ПН, ПО	ПА...ПД, ПК, ПЛ	ПР, ПК	ПК, ПР, ПЮ, ПЯ	ПД, ПЗ	ПР	ПК, ПР	ПК, ПР, ПЮ, ПЯ	ПА, ПР, ПЮ, ПЦ, МТ	ПА, ПР	545
Pskov Oblast	-	?	ПЗ, ПИ, НФ	ПС	ПС, ПХ	ПС, ПА	-	ПС	ПС, ПХ, (ПП), (ПУ)	ПС, ПТ, ПВ, ДР	ПВ, ПС	581
Rostov-on-Don	-	-	ГР, ГС, ГТ	-	-	-	-	-	-	-	-	-
Rostov Oblast	-	АГ, АЧ, АЭ	РА...РД, РО, РП, ЯР, ОИ	РО, РД, РП	РА, РБ, РГ, РД, РЕ, РК, РН	РА...РМ, РО...РЧ, РЩ...РЯ, ОЕ, ОИ, ЧК, ЧШ	РА, РВ, РГ, РЗ, РИ, РО	РД, РО, РП, {чРА}	РА, РБ, РГ, РД, РЖ, РЛ, (РП), (РУ)	РБ, РВ, РД, РЕ, РЖ, ФВ	РА, РД, РЕ	582
Ryazan Oblast	-	РО, РС	РЕ, РЖ, РЗ, РИ, РЯ	РЯ	РЯ, РЗ, РН	РС	РЯ	РЯ	РЯ, РН, (РЗ)	РЗ, РС	РЯ, РЗ	583
Saratov	-	-	СД, СЕ, СЖ, СЗ	-	-	-	-	-	-	-	-	-
Saratov Oblast	САРАТОВ	СА, СЧ	ЗС, ЗТ, ЗУ, ЗФ	СА, СЖ	СА, СЧ	-	-	СА, СЖ	СА, СБ, СЧ	СС, СЩ	СИ, СЩ	584
Sakhalin Oblast	-	-	СП, СЧ^{[2]}, СШ	СХ	СХ	-	-	СХ	СХ	СЛ	-	585
Sverdlovsk	-	-	СЛ, СМ, СН, ОЯ	-	-	-	-	-	-	-	-	-
Sverdlovsk Oblast	УРАЛ, СВЕРДЛОВСК	СВ, СГ, СД, СЕ, СЖ	ЗХ...ЗЯ, ИЯ	СВ, СФ	СВ, ЗУ, ЗФ, ЗЧ	СЗ, ЧУ, ОЮ	СЮ, СМ	СВ, СФ	СВ, ЗУ, ЗФ, ЗЧ, ЕЦ	СЗ, СХ, СШ, СЭ, РЭ	СЗ, СХ, СШ, ФЛ, ГХ	586
Northern Krai14.01.1929—05.12.1936Northern Oblast 05.12.1936—23.09.1937	СЕВЕР	СР	-	-	-	-	-	-	-	-	-	-
Severo-Ossetia ASSR	-	?	СХ, СЦ, РК	СЕ	СЕ, СЦ	-	-	СЕ	СЦ, (СЕ)	ШФ, ШВ	-	535
Smolensk Oblast	-	ЗБ	СР, СС, СИ, СК	СМ	СМ, СР	СЖ, СЧ	СГ, СЧ	СМ	СМ, УВ	СГ, СК, ИР	СК	587
Sochi	-	-	СО	СО	СО	СЧ	-	СО	СО	КГ	-	543, 700 Краснодарский край
Sredne-Volzhsky Oblast 20.10.1929—05.12.1936	СР.ВОЛГА	-	-	-	-	-	-	-	-	-	-	-
Stavropol Krai	С-КАВКАЗ, ОРДЖ.КРАЙ	СК, СМ, СН, СО	ЕИ, СА, СБ, СВ, СГ, СЯ, ЯЭ	СС, СТ	СТ, СФ, СШ, ЕИ	СА, СБ, СЕ, СЖ, СП, СЯ, ЖД	СЖ, СТ	СС, СТ	СТ, СФ, СШ, СЯ, (СЭ)	КЩ, ПХ, ПЦ, СА, СБ, СВ, СН, СО, КЧ	КЩ, СА, СБ	546
Stalingrad	-	-	СТ, СЩ, СЮ, ЯС	-	-	-	-	-	-	-	-	-
Tambov Oblast	-	ТА	ТА, ТБ, ТП, РШ	ТА	ТА, ТБ	ТА, ТБ, ТН	ТА, ТБ, ТД	ТА	ТА, ТЧ, (ТБ)	ТА, ТН	ТН	588
Tatar ASSR	ТАТАРИЯ	ТТ, ТУ	ТИ, ТК, ТЛ, ТР, ТС, РЧ	ТТ, ТБ	ТД, ТТ, ТЦ	ТО, ТП	ТК	ТБ, ТТ	ТТ, ТД, ТЦ, ПБ, (ПГ)	ТК, ТМ, ТР, ТС, ИС, ЮЭ	ТК, ТС	536
Tomsk Oblast	-	?	ТВ, ТН	ТО	ТО, ТМ	ТС	-	ТО	ТО, ИЦ, (ИЧ), (ИШ)	ТВ, ТЦ	ТВ	589
Tuvan ASSR	-	?	ТГ	ТВ	ТВ, ТГ	ТГ	-	ТВ	ТВ, (ТГ)	-	-	537
Tula Oblast	-	ТО	ТД, ТЕ, ТЖ, ТО, РЦ	ТУ, ТЛ	ТИ, ТУ, ТФ	ТУ, ТВ	ТФ	ТУ, ТЛ	ТУ, ТФ, ТИ	ТЕ, ТИ, ТУ, ЮЮ	ТИ, ЮЮ	590
Tyumen Oblast	-	ТЮ	ТЗ, ТМ, РЮ	ТЮ, ТМ	ТХ, ТЭ, ТЮ	-	-	ТЮ, ТМ	ТХ, ТЭ, ТЮ, ЮТ, ЮУ, ЮФ, ЮЮ	ЖШ, ТЗ	ТЕ	591
Udmurt ASSR	УДМУРТИЯ	УЯ	ХИ, ХК, ХЕ	УД	УД, УМ	-	УМ	УД	УД, УМ	УВ, ЮШ	-	538
Ulyanovsk Oblast	-	ВЭ	ХЛ, ХМ, ХН, ХР	УЛ	УЛ, УН	УЛ, УЕ	УЕ	УЛ	УЛ, УН	УЛ, УО, УЕ, ЮЩ	УЛ, УО, ЮЩ	592
Khabarovsk Krai	-	ДГ, ДЕ, ДИ, ДК	ХА...ХД, ХЗ	ХБ	ХБ, ХК	ХС	-	ХБ	ХБ, ХК	ХС, ХЧ	ХС	547
Khakas Autonomous Oblast From 1991	-	-	-	-	-	-	-	ХГ	БМ	ХО	-	697
Tsentralno-Chernozyom Oblast 14.05.1928—13.06.1934	ЦЧО	-	-	-	-	-	-	-	-	-	-	-
Chelyabinsk	-	-	ЧА, ЧБ, ЧВ	-	-	-	-	-	-	-	-	-
Chelyabinsk Oblast	ЧЕЛЯБИНСК	ЧБ, ЧВ, ЧГ, ЧЕ, ЧЖ	НГ...НЗ, НТ, НУ	ЧЕ, ЧБ	ЧБ, ЧГ, ЧЕ, ЧХ, ЧД	ЧЕ	ЧВ	ЧБ, ЧД, ЧЕ	ЧБ, ЧГ, ЧЕ, ЧХ, ЧЧ, ШО, ШП	ЧВ, ЧГ, ЧЭ, ЧЛ, ГС, ЧЦ, ЧЕ, КВ, ЩЧ	ЧВ, ЧГ, ЧЛ, ШИ	593
Chechen-Ingush ASSR05.12.1936—07.03.194409.01.1957—10.12.1992Grozny Oblast22.03.1944—09.01.1957	-	ЧИ	ГЕ, ГЖ, ГЗ	ЧИ	ЧИ	ЧВ, ЧИ	ЧВ	ЧИ	ЧИ, (ЧЖ)	ЧИ, ЧА, НП, ЮИ	ЧИ	539
Chita Oblast	-	ЧО	ЧЖ, ЧЗ, ЧИ, ЧЧ	ЧТ	ЧТ, ЧЗ	ЧА	-	ЧТ	ЧЗ, ЧТ	ЧА, ЧТ	-	594
Chuvash ASSR	ЧУВАШИЯ	ЧА	ЧН, ЧО	ЧУ	ЧУ, ЧФ	ЧН	-	ЧУ	ЧУ, (ЧФ)	ЧН, ЧТ	ЧГ, ЧН	540
Chukotka Autonomous Okrug From 1992	-	-	-	-	-	-	-	ЧА	МФ, УГ	-	-	572 Магаданская область
Yakut ASSR	ЯКУТИЯ	ЯР	ЯЗ, ЯГ, ЯД	ЯК	ЯА, ЯК, ЯТ	ЯК	[ЯГ]	ЯК	ЯА, (ЯК), (ЯТ)	-	-	541
Yaroslavl Oblast	-	ЯО, ЯЩ	ЯА, ЯВ, ЯЖ, ЯЕ	ЯР	ЯО, ЯР	ЯА, ЯГ	[ЯА]	ЯР	ЯР, ЯО	ЯА, ЯР, НШ, ШИ, ШН, ОУ, ЯУ	ЯА, ОУ	595
Tajik SSR
General series	[ТАДЖ-СТАН]	ТД, ТЕ	-	-	-	-	-	-	-	-	-	-
Gharm Oblast 27.10.1939—24.08.1955	-	-	ЖА	-	-	-	-	-	-	-	-	-
Gorno-Badakhshan Autonomous Region	-	-	ЖБ	ГБ	ГБ, ГД	-	-	ГБ	ГБ, ГД	-	-	630
Districts of Republican Subordination	-	-	ЖЗ (Душанбе); ЖИ, ЖК (районы)	СБ, ДБ	ЖА, СБ	-	-	ДБ	ДБ, ДУ	-	-	627
Kulob Oblast 27.10.1939—24.08.1955 29.12.1973—09.1988	-	-	ЖВ	КЮ	ЖЖ	-	-	КЮ	ЖЖ	-	-	628
Kurgan-Tiube Oblast 07.01.1944—23.01.1947 29.12.1973—09.1988	-	-	ЖГ	ТД	ЖЕ	-	-	ТД	ЖЕ	-	ТФ	683
Leninabad Oblast	-	-	ЖД, ЖЕ	ЛБ	ЛБ, ЛХ	-	-	ЛБ	ЛХ, (ЛБ)	ЛТ	-	629
Stalinabad Oblast 27.10.1939—10.04.1951	-	-	ЖЖ, ЖЗ	-	-	-	-	-	-	-	-	-
Khatlon Region since 09.1988	-	-	-	-	-	-	-	ХТ	-	-	-	628, 683
Turkmen SSR
General series	ТУРК-СТАН	ТР, ПЛ	-	-	-	-	-	-	-	-	-	-
Districts of TSSR 25.05.1959—27.12.1973	-	-	-	ТР	ТР	ЖК	-	-	-	-	-	-
Ashgabat Region	-	-	ЗА, ЗБ, ЗВ	АШ	АШ	-	-	АШ	АШ	-	-	631
Krasnovodsk Oblast	-	-	ЗГ	НТ	НТ	-	-	НТ, БЛ	БЛ	-	-	632, 698
Mary Oblast	-	-	ЗД	МХ	МЦ, ТС	-	-	МХ	-	-	-	633
Tashauz Oblast	-	-	ЗЕ	ТЗ	ТЗ	-	-	ТЗ	ТЗ	-	-	634
Chardzhou Oblast	-	-	ЗЖ	ЧР	ЧР	-	-	ЧР	ЧР	-	-	635
Ukrainian SSR
Vinnytsia Oblast	ВИННИЦА	УВ, УГ	УА, УЦ, ЩК, ЩЦ, ЖЮ	ВИ	ВИ, ВЦ	-	-	ВИ	ВИ, ВЦ	УЗ, УК	ВА	649
Volyn Oblast	-	ФЖ	УВ, ЩШ	ВН	ВН, ВС	-	ВЛ, УВ	ВН	ВН, ВЧ	ВИ, ВШ	ВИ, ВШ	650
Dnipropetrovsk	-	-	УИ, ЧЮ, ЧЯ	-	-	-	-	-	-	-	-	-
Dnipropetrovsk Oblast	ДНЕПР	УП, УР, УФ, ЦД	УК, ФЩ, ЩО, ЩЮ, ЧГ, ГЩ, ХЯ	ДН, ДП	ДН, ДО, ДП	-	-	ДН, ДП	ДН, ДО, ДР, ДМ, ДП, (ДХ), (ДЭ)	ЕВ	-	652
Donetsk Oblast	ДОНЕЦ	УД, УЕ, УЖ, ФЧ	УУ, УФ, УХ, УЩ, ЩЖ, ЩЕ, ЩЗ, ЩИ, ЩХ, ЧЕ, ЧУ, ЧФ, ДЕ, ХХ, ПУ, ПФ, ПЮ	СЛ, ДО, ДЦ	СЖ, СЛ, ДЕ, ДЦ	-	УЯ	ДО, ДЦ	СЛ, СЖ, ДЕ, (ДЛ), (ДФ)	ДЦ, ШУ	-	653
Drohobych Oblast 04.12.1939—21.05.1959	-	ШБ	УЖ, УЗ	ДР	ДР	-	-	-	-	-	-	-
Zhytomyr Oblast	-	УЭ, ФМ	УМ, УН, ЩЯ	ЖИ	ЖИ, ЖК	-	-	ЖИ, ЖЖ, ЖБ	ЖИ, ЖК	ЖА, ЖБ, ЖЦ	ЖА, ЖБ	654
Transcarpatian Oblast	-	-	УЛ, ЩР, ЯХ	ЗА	ЗА, ЗТ	ЗГ	-	ЗА	ЗА, (ЗТ)	ЗД	ЗА	655
Zaporizhia Oblast	-	ХА	УО, УП, ЩТ, ЩУ	ЗП, ЗР	ЗП, ЗР	УО	-	ЗП, ЗН, (ЗР)	ЗП, ЗР, ЗО, (ЗС)	ЗЕ, ЗЖ, ЗП	ЗЕ, ЗЖ	656
Ivano-Frankivsk Oblast	-	ФВ	ФУ, ТЦ	СЯ, ИФ	СЭ, СЯ, ИГ, ИД	ЦМ	-	ИФ	ИД, (ИГ)	ИК	ИЕ	657
Izmail Oblast 07.08.1940—15.02.1954	-	ЮЮ	УР, ЩФ	-	-	-	-	-	-	-	-	-
Kyiv	КИЕВ	УК, УЛ, ФО, ФП	УЧ, УШ, УЭ, УЮ, ЩА, ЩБ, ЯЮ, ЯЯ	КИ, ХТ	КИ, УЧ, УШ	-	-	КИ, ХТ	КИ, УЧ, УШ	-	-	658
Kyiv Oblast	КИЕВ	УЭ, УЮ, ФС	ФН, ФО, ФП, ФР, ЩС	КХ	КХ, УС, ФН	ФА, ФН, ФО, КВ	ФА, ФН, ФО	КХ	КХ, ФЛ, ФМ, ФН	КВ, КД, УМ, ФН	КД	659
Kirovohrad Oblast	-	ХК	ФА, ФБ, ТФ, ХЭ	КД	КД, ФА, [ША] (Note: Курсивом отмечены серии, существование которых под вопросом.)	-	-	КД	КД, ФА	ФГ, ФД	ФГ, ФД	660
Crimean Oblast	КРЫМ	КТ, КД, КЕ	КМ, КЯ, ЦР, ЦС, ЦЧ, ЦЛ	КР, ЦС	КР, ЦС, ЦР	ХЖ	ХЖ	КР	КР, ЦР, ЦС, ЦД	ЗГ, ФЕ, ФМ, ФЖ	ФЕ	661
Luhansk Oblast	-	ФГ	УБ, УГ, УД, УЕ, ЩД, ЩЛ, ЩМ	ЛУ, ВГ	ЛУ, ЛФ, ВП, ВР	УГ	-	ВГ, (ЛУ)	ВР, ВП, ЛУ, (ЛФ)	ВЖ, ВЧ, ВШ	ВЖ	651
Lviv	-	-	ФВ, ЩВ, ЩГ	-	-	-	-	-	-	-	-	-
Lviv Oblast	-	ФК, [АЕ]	УЯ, ТХ	ЛВ, ДР	ЛВ, ЛС, ДЧ	-	-	ЛВ	ЛВ, ЛС	ЛА, ЛБ	ЛБ	662
Moldavian ASSR 12.10.1924—02.08.1940	МОЛДАВИЯ	УМ	-	-	-	-	-	-	-	-	-	-
Mykolaiv Oblast	-	УН, УБ	ФЕ, ФД, ЩП	НИ	НИ, НК	-	-	НИ	НИ, НК	НИ, НА, ОЭ	НА, НИ	663
Odessa	-	-	ФЖ, ЧТ, ЧС, ЧД	-	-	-	-	-	-	-	-	-
Odessa Oblast	ОДЕССА	УО, УС, ФФ, ФХ	ФГ, ФЗ, ФИ, УР (пр)	ОД, ОЕ	ОГ, ОД, ОЕ	ЗВ, ОВ, ОГ, ОИ	-	ОД	ОГ, ОД, ОЕ, ОЭ	ОА, ОБ, ОО, ОП	ОА, ОБ	664
Poltava Oblast	-	УУ, ЮА	ФК, ФЛ, ТУ, ХЩ	ПО	ПО, ПТ	ПУ	ПЛ	ПО	ПО, ПТ	ПЛ, ПГ	УХ	665
Rivne Oblast	-	ФЕ, ФЩ	ФМ, ЩН, ТЮ	РВ	РВ	РК	ЦМ	РВ	РВ, РИ	РБ, РД	РБ	666
Sumy Oblast	-	УЩ, ХС	ФС, ФТ, ЩЧ	СУ	СУ, СИ	-	СК, ФП	СУ	СУ, (СИ)	СД, СЕ	СД, ШР	667
Ternopil Oblast	-	?	ФФ, ТЧ	ТЕ	ТЕ, ТЖ	-	-	ТЕ	ТЕ, ТЖ	ТЖ, ТД, ЛЄ	-	668
Kharkiv	-	-	ФХ, ЧП, ЧР, ЧХ	-	-	-	-	-	-	-	-	-
Kharkiv Oblast	ХАРЬКОВ	УХ, УЦ, УШ, ФЮ	ФЦ, ФЧ, ХО	ХА, ХК	ХА, ХВ, ХГ	ХА, ФХ, ФЧ, ХЧ, [АГ]	ФХ, ХА, ХР	ХА, ХК	ХА, ХГ, ХЦ, ХЮ, ХЕ	ХБ, ХК, ХИ	ХА	669
Kherson Oblast	-	ХН	ФШ, ЩЩ, ТЭ	ХО	ХН, ХО	ХЕ, ХЛ	-	ХО	ХН, ХД, ХЖ, ХШ, (ХИ)	ХГ, ХП	ХГ, ХЕ	670
Khmelnytskyi Oblast	-	УТ	УС, УТ, ЩЭ, ЯШ	ХМ, ХЛ	УЗ, УС, УТ, [ХЦ]	УЗ, ХН	-	ХМ	ХМ, ХЛ, ХФ	ХД, ХЕ, ШТ	ХД	671
Cherkasy Oblast	-	-	ТТ, ОЩ, ТЯ	ЧК	ЧК, ЧС	-	-	ЧК	ЧК, ЧС, (ЧЛ), (ЧМ)	ЧБ, ЧД, [ХФ]	ЧГ, ЧБ	672
Chernivtsi Oblast	ЧЕРНИГОВ	УЧ	ФЭ, ФЮ, ЦН	ЧН	ЧН, ЧО	ФЭ, ЧГ	ЧТ	ЧН	ЧН, ЧО	ФЮ, УУ, УХ	ФЭ	673
Chernihiv Oblast	-	ЮЧ	ФЯ, ТЯ	ЧВ	ЧВ, ЧЦ	ЧЕ	-	ЧВ	ЧЦ, (ЧВ), (ОЯ)	ЧС	ЧС	674
Uzbek SSR
General series	УЗБ-СТАН	УЗ, УА	-	-	-	-	-	-	-	-	-	-
Andijan Region	-	?	ЕА, ЕТ	АН	АЖ, АН	-	-	АН, (АУ)	АЖ, (АН)	-	-	637
Bukhara Region	-	?	ЕО	БХ	БХ, БЦ	-	-	БХ, (БО)	БХ, БЦ	БВ, БХ	-	638
Jizzakh Region	-	-	-	ДД	ДД	-	-	ДД, (ДЗ)	ДД	-	-	639
Karakalpak ASSR (Note: In Russian SFSR until 05.12.1936.)	КАРА-КАЛП	КК	ЕГ	КП	КП, ЕГ	ЕЮ	-	КП, (НУ)	КП, (ЕГ)	-	-	636
Kashkadarya Region	-	?	ЕВ	КФ	КФ, ЕВ	-	-	КФ, (ДР)	КФ, ЕВ	-	-	640
Navoiy Region	-	-	-	-	-	-	-	НВ, (НЯ)	НЮ	-	-	638 Бухарская область
Namangan Region	-	?	ЕД	НА	НА, НН	-	-	НА, (НГ)	НА	НО	-	641
Samarkand Region	-	РП	ЕЕ, ЕЧ	СН	СН	СА	-	СН	СН, НЯ	СЖ	[ЕЧ]	642
Surkhandarya Region	-	?	ЕЖ	СД	СД, ЕЖ	-	-	СД, (СЯ)	СД, ЕЖ	-	-	643
Sirdaryo Region	-	-	-	СИ	СС, ДК	-	-	СИ, (СЛ)	СС, (ДК)	-	-	644
Tashkent	-	РУ	ЕЗ, ЕФ, ЕХ, ЕЭ	ТН	ТН, ЕФ	РШ	-	ТН, (ТЖ), (УЗ)	ТН, ЕФ, (УЕ), (УЗ)	ЕР	ЕР, ЕМ	645
Tashkent Region	-	РХ	ЕК, ЕЛ, ЕУ, ЕЮ	ТШ	ТШ, ЕК	-	-	ТШ, (ТЭ)	ТШ, ЕК	-	-	646
Fergana Region	-	РФ	ЕМ, ЕЦ	ФЕ	ФГ, ФЕ	-	-	ФЕ, (ФГ)	ФЕ, (ФГ)	-	-	647
Khorezm Region	-	?	ЕН	ХЗ	ХЗ, ХЧ	-	-	ХЗ, (ХЯ), ({ХЕА})	ХЗ, (ХЧ)	ХЖ	-	648

== See also ==
- Vehicle registration plates of Russia
