= Vehicle registration plates of Mongolia =

Mongolia
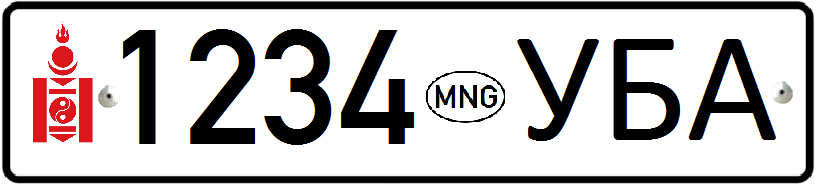
- Pre-2018 regular legal standard number plate from Mongolia.
- Country: Mongolia
- Country code: MGL

Current series
- Size: 520 mm × 110 mm 20.5 in × 4.3 in
- Serial format: 1234 AAA
- Colour (front): Black on white
- Colour (rear): Black on white

Vehicle registration plates of Mongolia consist of four digits (including leading zeroes) and three Cyrillic letters. The design is reminiscent of the Soviet standard for licence plates in the former USSR (GOST 3207-77), some of which had four digits and three letters.

The design was updated in 2001 to include the national symbol (the "Soyombo") in red to the left of the numbers, and – between the digits and letters – the Mongolian IDL 'MNG' in an oval (despite 'MGL' being the official international identifier).

Since about 2018, many newly-produced licence plates have used the Roboto typeface in lieu of DIN 1451.

The first two letters of the three-letter suffix indicate the province (or aimag in Mongolian) where the vehicle was registered:

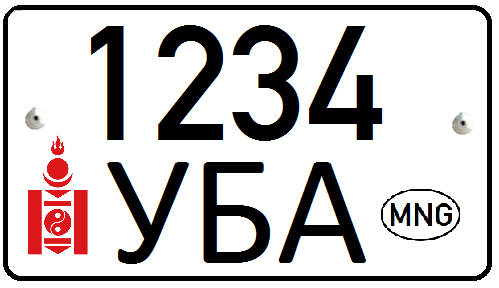

Suffix	Aimag
АР	Arkhangai aimag
БH	Bayankhongor aimag
БP	Baganuur (Ulaanbaatar city)
БӨ	Bayan-Ölgii aimag
БУ	Bulgan aimag
ГА	Govi-Altay aimag
ГС	Govisumber aimag
ДА	Darkhan-Uul aimag
ДГ	Dornogovi aimag
ДО	Dornod aimag
ДУ	Dundgovi aimag
OP	Orkhon aimag
ХЭ	Khentii aimag
ХО	Khovd aimag
ХӨ	Khövsgöl aimag
НА	Nalaikh district (Ulaanbaatar city)
ӨМ	Ömnögovi aimag
ӨВ	Övörkhangai aimag
СЭ	Selenge aimag (except Sükhbaatar)
СҮ	Sükhbaatar aimag
СБ	Sükhbaatar city (Selenge aimag)
ТӨ	Töv aimag
УБ, УН, УА, УЕ, УК	Ulaanbaatar (except Baganuur, Nalaikh)
УВ	Uvs aimag
ЗА	Zavkhan aimag
