= Vehicle registration plates of the Collectivity of Saint Martin =

Overseas Collectivity of Saint Martin
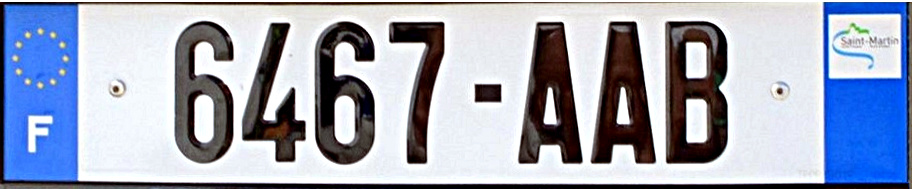
- Current regular legal standard number plate from Saint Martin (978), France.
- Country: Saint Martin (France)
- Country code: F

Current series
- Size: 520 mm × 110 mm 20.5 in × 4.3 in
- Serial format: 1234 ABC
- Colour (front): Black on white
- Colour (rear): Black on white

The Collectivity of Saint Martin requires its residents to register their motor vehicles and display vehicle registration plates. Current plates are European standard 520 mm × 110 mm (20.5 in × 4.3 in), and use French stamping dies. The overseas departments and territories of France have three-digit codes based on the numbering system for departments in France, starting with 97, which was originally the single code designating overseas territories.

Image	First issued	Design	Serial format	Serials issued	Notes
	1993		123 ABC		97-1 signifies Guadeloupe and nearby French islands.
	2009	French stamp	1234-ABC		
	2009	French stamp	123-AB		

== See also ==
- Vehicle registration plates of Sint Maarten
