= Vehicle registration plates of Sint Maarten =

Sint Maarten
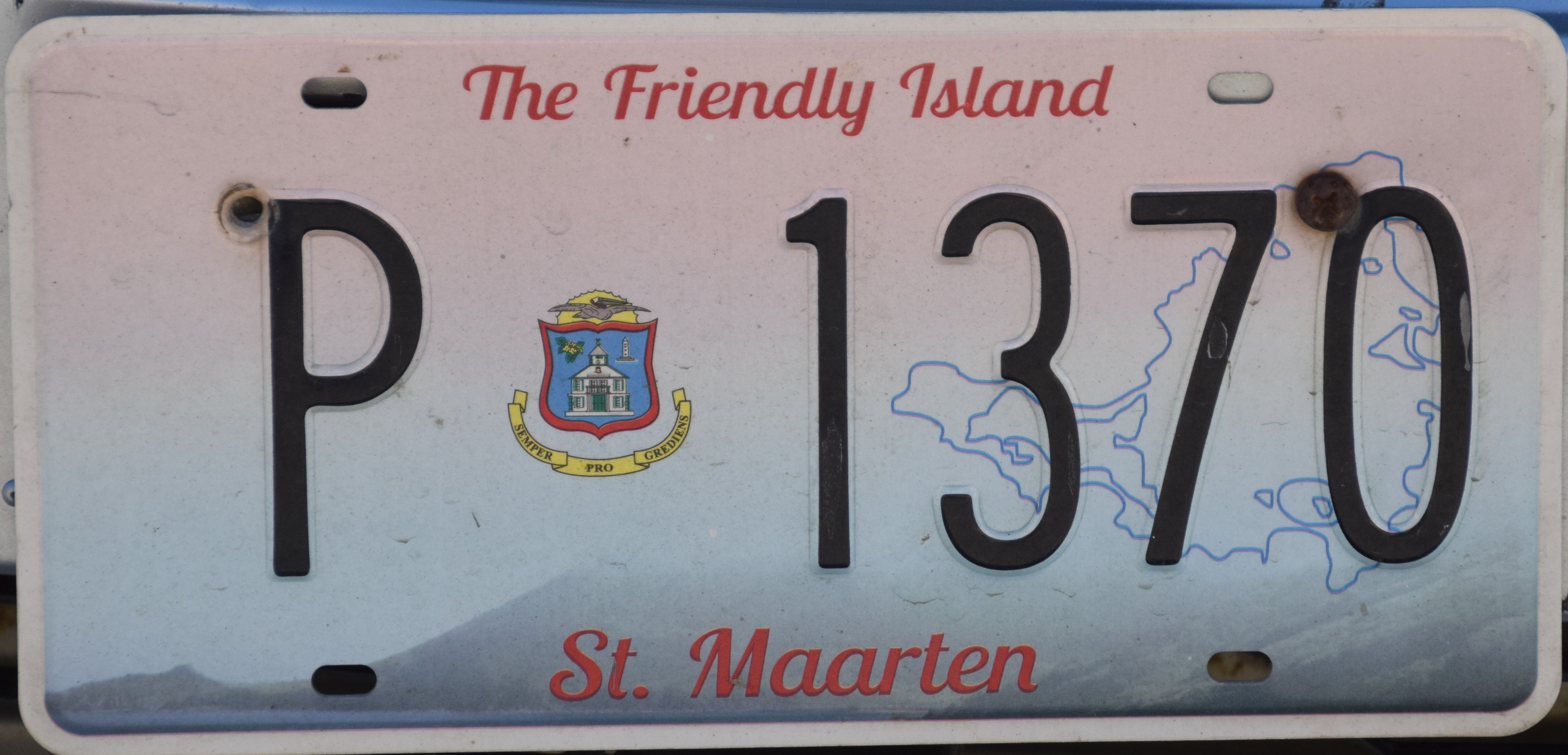
- Regular legal standard number plate from Sint Maarten.
- Country: Sint Maarten (Netherlands)
- Country code: None

Current series
- Slogan: The Friendly Island
- Size: 520 mm × 110 mm 20.5 in × 4.3 in
- Serial format: A 1234
- Colour (front): Black on white
- Colour (rear): Black on white

Sint Maarten requires its residents to register their motor vehicles and display vehicle registration plates. Current plates are North American standard 6 in × 12 in (152 mm × 300 mm). Some plates start with certain letter(s) to denote vehicle type: V for commercial vehicles, TX for taxis, D for governmental vehicles, and AB for buses. Other letters are in use on the license plates, such as P and M.

Image	First issued	Design	Slogan	Serial format	Serials issued	Notes
	2005		The Friendly Island	A 1234		

== See also ==
- Vehicle registration plates of the Collectivity of Saint Martin
