= List of RAL colours =

The following is a list of RAL Classic colours from the European RAL colour standard. The visual samples are approximate and informative only.

== RAL Classic ==
=== Yellow and beige ===
| Number | Sample | Colour name | Description, examples |
|---|---|---|---|
| RAL 1000 | | Green beige | |
| RAL 1001 | | Beige | |
| RAL 1002 | | Sand yellow | Vehicles of the Afrika Korps 1941–1943 |
| RAL 1003 | | Signal yellow | Latvian Pasažieru vilciens (Vivi) train main livery colour |
| RAL 1004 | | Golden yellow | Caterpillar Yellow |
| RAL 1005 | | Honey yellow | |
| RAL 1006 | | Maize yellow | |
| RAL 1007 | | Daffodil yellow | |
| RAL 1011 | | Brown beige | |
| RAL 1012 | | Lemon yellow | |
| RAL 1013 | | Oyster white | |
| RAL 1014 | | Ivory | |
| RAL 1015 | | Light ivory | Mandatory for taxis in Germany since 1971, although in limited states only in recent years. |
| RAL 1016 | | Sulfur yellow | Standard European ambulance colour in accordance with CEN 1789. |
| RAL 1017 | | Saffron yellow | |
| RAL 1018 | | Zinc yellow | |
| RAL 1019 | | Grey beige | |
| RAL 1020 | | Olive yellow | |
| RAL 1021 | | Colza yellow | Österreichische Post, Deutsche Bundespost 1972–1980, gold in the flag of Germany |
| RAL 1023 | | Traffic yellow | U4 line of the Berlin U-Bahn, Germany; S6 line of the Milan S Lines |
| RAL 1024 | | Ochre yellow | |
| RAL 1026 | | Luminous yellow | |
| RAL 1027 | | Curry | |
| RAL 1028 | | Melon yellow | Lufthansa |
| RAL 1032 | | Broom yellow | Deutsche Bundespost since 1980, since 1998 Deutsche Post AG |
| RAL 1033 | | Dahlia yellow | |
| RAL 1034 | | Pastel yellow | |
| RAL 1035 | | Pearl beige | |
| RAL 1036 | | Pearl gold | |
| RAL 1037 | | Sun yellow | |

=== Orange ===
| Number | Sample | Colour name | Description, examples |
|---|---|---|---|
| RAL 2000 | | Yellow orange | |
| RAL 2001 | | Red orange | |
| RAL 2002 | | Blood orange | U2 line of the Berlin U-Bahn |
| RAL 2003 | | Pastel orange | U9 line of the Berlin U-Bahn; the Helsinki Metro system |
| RAL 2004 | | Pure orange | |
| RAL 2005 | | Luminous orange | |
| RAL 2007 | | Luminous bright orange | |
| RAL 2008 | | Bright red orange | |
| RAL 2009 | | Traffic orange | KTM orange |
| RAL 2010 | | Signal orange | |
| RAL 2011 | | Deep orange | CIÉ Supertrain; S5 line of the Milan S Lines |
| RAL 2012 | | Salmon orange | |
| RAL 2013 | | Pearl orange | |
| RAL 2017 | | RAL orange | Introduced January 2020 |

=== Red ===
| Number | Sample | Colour name | Description, examples |
|---|---|---|---|
| RAL 3000 | | Flame red | |
| RAL 3001 | | Signal red | The BAE Hawk flown by the Red Arrows |
| RAL 3002 | | Carmine red | |
| RAL 3003 | | Ruby red | The text of Belgian license plates since November 2010 |
| RAL 3004 | | Purple red | Old Jawa Moto motorcycles; Deutsche Bundesbahn diesel locomotives and dining cars until 1974; Trans Europ Express trains (with RAL 1001 Beige) |
| RAL 3005 | | Wine red | |
| RAL 3007 | | Black red | |
| RAL 3009 | | Oxide red | |
| RAL 3011 | | Brown red | |
| RAL 3012 | | Beige red | |
| RAL 3013 | | Tomato red | |
| RAL 3014 | | Antique pink | |
| RAL 3015 | | Light pink | |
| RAL 3016 | | Coral red | |
| RAL 3017 | | Rose | |
| RAL 3018 | | Strawberry red | |
| RAL 3020 | | Traffic red | Locomotives and rolling stock of Deutsche Bahn, flag of Germany |
| RAL 3022 | | Salmon pink | |
| RAL 3024 | | Luminous red | |
| RAL 3026 | | Luminous bright red | |
| RAL 3027 | | Raspberry red | |
| RAL 3028 | | Pure red | |
| RAL 3031 | | Orient red | |
| RAL 3032 | | Pearl ruby red | |
| RAL 3033 | | Pearl pink | |

=== Violet ===
| Number | Sample | Colour name | Description, examples |
|---|---|---|---|
| RAL 4001 | | Red lilac | |
| RAL 4002 | | Red violet | |
| RAL 4003 | | Heather violet | |
| RAL 4004 | | Claret violet | |
| RAL 4005 | | Blue lilac | U6 line of the Berlin U-Bahn |
| RAL 4006 | | Traffic purple | |
| RAL 4007 | | Purple violet | |
| RAL 4008 | | Signal violet | |
| RAL 4009 | | Pastel violet | |
| RAL 4010 | | Telemagenta | Deutsche Telekom |
| RAL 4011 | | Pearl violet | |
| RAL 4012 | | Pearl blackberry | |

=== Blue ===
| Number | Sample | Colour name | Description, examples |
|---|---|---|---|
| RAL 5000 | | Violet blue | |
| RAL 5001 | | Green blue | |
| RAL 5002 | | Ultramarine blue | |
| RAL 5003 | | Sapphire blue | |
| RAL 5004 | | Black blue | |
| RAL 5005 | | Signal blue | |
| RAL 5007 | | Brilliant blue | |
| RAL 5008 | | Grey blue | |
| RAL 5009 | | Azure blue | |
| RAL 5010 | | Gentian blue | U8 line of the Berlin U-Bahn |
| RAL 5011 | | Steel blue | |
| RAL 5012 | | Light blue | U7 line of the Berlin U-Bahn |
| RAL 5013 | | Cobalt blue | Deutsche Bundesbahn express locomotives and first class cars 1962–1971 |
| RAL 5014 | | Pigeon blue | |
| RAL 5015 | | Sky blue | Colour used for TfL Cycle Superhighways; colour of the University of Barcelona and VU Amsterdam, original colour of FMŻ Bizon Z058 Rekord since the year 1999, main colour of the Helsinki Regional Transport Authority (HSL). |
| RAL 5017 | | Traffic blue | Ghent University |
| RAL 5018 | | Turquoise blue | |
| RAL 5019 | | Capri blue | |
| RAL 5020 | | Ocean blue | |
| RAL 5021 | | Water blue | |
| RAL 5022 | | Night blue | Lufthansa |
| RAL 5023 | | Distant blue | |
| RAL 5024 | | Pastel blue | Used in early Kombinat Fortschritt Landmaschinen agricultural machinery |
| RAL 5025 | | Pearl gentian | |
| RAL 5026 | | Pearl night blue | |

=== Green ===
| Number | Sample | Colour name | Description, examples |
|---|---|---|---|
| RAL 6000 | | Patina green | |
| RAL 6001 | | Emerald green | Emerald |
| RAL 6002 | | Leaf green | |
| RAL 6003 | | Olive green | East German army |
| RAL 6004 | | Blue green | |
| RAL 6005 | | Moss green | British racing green |
| RAL 6006 | | Grey olive | Standard Feldgrau used by the Wehrmacht |
| RAL 6007 | | Bottle green | |
| RAL 6008 | | Brown green | |
| RAL 6009 | | Fir green | Galactica |
| RAL 6010 | | Grass green | |
| RAL 6011 | | Reseda green | |
| RAL 6012 | | Black green | Until 1994 for some units of the Bundesgrenzschutz |
| RAL 6013 | | Reed green | |
| RAL 6014 | | Yellow olive | Until 1984 for vehicles of the German Bundeswehr. Since 1993 for the Swiss army bicycles. |
| RAL 6015 | | Black olive | |
| RAL 6016 | | Turquoise green | U3 line of the Berlin U-Bahn |
| RAL 6017 | | May green | |
| RAL 6018 | | Yellow green | U1 line of the Berlin U-Bahn |
| RAL 6019 | | Pastel green | |
| RAL 6020 | | Chromium green | Deutsche Bundesbahn wagons for passenger transport until 1985 (Epoche III und IV) |
| RAL 6021 | | Pale green | |
| RAL 6022 | | Brown olive | |
| RAL 6024 | | Traffic green | |
| RAL 6025 | | Fern green | |
| RAL 6026 | | Opal green | |
| RAL 6027 | | Light green | |
| RAL 6028 | | Pine green | |
| RAL 6029 | | Mint green | Some units of Bundesgrenzschutz from 1994 to 2005 |
| RAL 6031 | | Bronze green | Since 1984 for vehicles of the German Bundeswehr. |
| RAL 6032 | | Signal green | |
| RAL 6033 | | Mint turquoise | |
| RAL 6034 | | Pastel turquoise | Galactica |
| RAL 6035 | | Pearl green | |
| RAL 6036 | | Pearl opal green | |
| RAL 6037 | | Pure green | |
| RAL 6038 | | Luminous green | |
| RAL 6039 | | Fibrous green | Introduced in 2022. Developed in cooperation with the VDE = Association for Electrical, Electronic & Information Technologies |

=== Grey ===
| Number | Sample | Colour name | Description, examples |
|---|---|---|---|
| RAL 7000 | | Squirrel grey | |
| RAL 7001 | | Silver grey | |
| RAL 7002 | | Olive grey | |
| RAL 7003 | | Moss grey | |
| RAL 7004 | | Signal grey | |
| RAL 7005 | | Mouse grey | |
| RAL 7006 | | Beige grey | |
| RAL 7008 | | Khaki grey | |
| RAL 7009 | | Green grey | Original feldgrau No. 2 |
| RAL 7010 | | Tarpaulin grey | |
| RAL 7011 | | Iron grey | |
| RAL 7012 | | Basalt grey | |
| RAL 7013 | | Brown grey or NATO olive | Austrian Armed Forces |
| RAL 7015 | | Slate grey | |
| RAL 7016 | | Anthracite grey | Added for use by Wehrmacht |
| RAL 7021 | | Black grey | Added in 1937 for use by Wehrmacht under the name Dunkelgrau |
| RAL 7022 | | Umbra grey | |
| RAL 7023 | | Concrete grey | |
| RAL 7024 | | Graphite grey | |
| RAL 7026 | | Granite grey | |
| RAL 7030 | | Stone grey | |
| RAL 7031 | | Blue grey | |
| RAL 7032 | | Pebble grey | |
| RAL 7033 | | Cement grey | |
| RAL 7034 | | Yellow grey | |
| RAL 7035 | | Light grey | ICE train text, electrical and instrumentation panels. |
| RAL 7036 | | Platinum grey | |
| RAL 7037 | | Dusty grey | |
| RAL 7038 | | Agate grey | |
| RAL 7039 | | Quartz grey | |
| RAL 7040 | | Window grey | |
| RAL 7042 | | Traffic grey A | |
| RAL 7043 | | Traffic grey B | |
| RAL 7044 | | Silk grey | |
| RAL 7045 | | Telegrey 1 | 1992 introduced for Deutsche Bundespost (Telekom) |
| RAL 7046 | | Telegrey 2 | 1992 introduced for Deutsche Bundespost (Telekom) |
| RAL 7047 | | Telegrey 4 | 1992 introduced for Deutsche Bundespost (Telekom) |
| RAL 7048 | | Pearl mouse grey | |

=== Brown ===
| Number | Sample | Colour name | Description, examples |
|---|---|---|---|
| RAL 8000 | | Green brown | Under the name Gelbbraun since 1941 for the Afrika Korps of Wehrmacht also used by the Bundeswehr |
| RAL 8001 | | Ochre brown | |
| RAL 8002 | | Signal brown | Extra camouflage colour (to RAL 7021) for vehicles of the Wehrmacht before 1940 |
| RAL 8003 | | Clay brown | |
| RAL 8004 | | Copper brown | |
| RAL 8007 | | Fawn brown | U5 line of the Berlin U-Bahn |
| RAL 8008 | | Olive brown | |
| RAL 8011 | | Nut brown | |
| RAL 8012 | | Red brown | |
| RAL 8014 | | Sepia brown | |
| RAL 8015 | | Chestnut brown | |
| RAL 8016 | | Mahogany brown | |
| RAL 8017 | | Chocolate brown | |
| RAL 8019 | | Grey brown | |
| RAL 8022 | | Black brown | |
| RAL 8023 | | Orange brown | |
| RAL 8024 | | Beige brown | |
| RAL 8025 | | Pale brown | |
| RAL 8028 | | Terra brown | |
| RAL 8029 | | Pearl copper | |

=== White and black ===
| Number | Sample | Colour name | Description, examples |
|---|---|---|---|
| RAL 9001 | | Cream | |
| RAL 9002 | | Grey white | |
| RAL 9003 | | Signal white | |
| RAL 9004 | | Signal black | |
| RAL 9005 | | Jet black | |
| RAL 9006 | | White aluminium | Originally a corrosion protection specification; not recommended for decorative use |
| RAL 9007 | | Grey aluminium | Originally a corrosion protection specification; not recommended for decorative use |
| RAL 9010 | | Pure white | Door white |
| RAL 9011 | | Graphite black | |
| RAL 9012 | | Clean room white | Introduced in 2020 |
| RAL 9016 | | Traffic white | |
| RAL 9017 | | Traffic black | |
| RAL 9018 | | Papyrus white | |
| RAL 9022 | | Pearl light grey | |
| RAL 9023 | | Pearl dark grey | |

=== Overview ===
Below is a list of RAL Classic colours from the RAL colour standard. Alongside every colour, the corresponding values are given for:

- hexadecimal triplet for the sRGB colour space, approximating the given RAL colour
- sRGB value
- Grey value calculated from (0.2126 × red) + (0.7152 × green) + (0.0722 × blue)
- CIE L*a*b* values
- sRGB value expressed as hue, saturation and lightness (HSL)
- device-independent CMYK value: cyan, magenta, yellow, black or key
- LRV, but a consistent light reflectance value is not obtainable from pearlescent or metallic colours

The visual samples displayed on the screen are not binding because brightness and contrast may vary from screen to screen – and neither are the colours on a printout from a printer. For binding colour samples, always obtain an official RAL Colour fan deck.

All colours defined in RAL Classic
| RAL number | English name | Sample | sRGB 8-bit | Grey | 8-bit sRGB | | | sRGB HSL | | | CIELAB 1976 | | | CMYK | | | | LRV |
| RAL number | English name | Sample | Hex triplet | C_{linear} | red | green | blue | H° | S% | L% | L*% | a* | b* | C% | M% | Y% | K% | LRV |
|---|---|---|---|---|---|---|---|---|---|---|---|---|---|---|---|---|---|---|
| RAL 1000 | Green beige | | #CDBA88 | 186.29 | 205 | 186 | 136 | 47.08° | 37.57 | 66.08 | 76.022 | −0.366 | 27.636 | 0 | 7 | 32 | 21 | 50 |
| RAL 1001 | Beige | | #D0B084 | 178.70 | 208 | 176 | 132 | 36.99° | 41.71 | 65.69 | 73.595 | 5.518 | 26.95 | 0 | 14 | 36 | 20 | 46 |
| RAL 1002 | Sand yellow | | #D2AA6D | 173.04 | 210 | 170 | 109 | 38.13° | 48.98 | 61.57 | 71.934 | 7.362 | 36.744 | 0 | 17 | 47 | 20 | 44 |
| RAL 1003 | Signal yellow | | #F9A800 | 172.32 | 249 | 168 | 0 | 41.90° | 100 | 47.45 | 75.041 | 19.801 | 80.264 | 0 | 30 | 100 | 5 | 48 |
| RAL 1004 | Golden yellow | | #E49E00 | 160.70 | 228 | 158 | 0 | 43.17° | 100 | 43.33 | 70.089 | 16.1 | 78.815 | 0 | 28 | 100 | 13 | 41 |
| RAL 1005 | Honey yellow | | #CB8E00 | 144.16 | 203 | 142 | 0 | 43.55° | 100 | 38.63 | 63.448 | 13.382 | 74.694 | 0 | 27 | 100 | 23 | 32 |
| RAL 1006 | Maize yellow | | #E29000 | 150.26 | 226 | 144 | 0 | 39.73° | 100 | 42.94 | 66.562 | 22.472 | 76.492 | 0 | 34 | 100 | 14 | 36 |
| RAL 1007 | Daffodil yellow | | #E88C00 | 148.89 | 232 | 140 | 0 | 37.43° | 100 | 44.31 | 66.5 | 27.308 | 80.402 | 0 | 38 | 100 | 11 | 36 |
| RAL 1011 | Brown beige | | #AF804F | 134.32 | 175 | 128 | 79 | 32.61° | 36.8 | 49.02 | 57.338 | 12.518 | 33.353 | 0 | 25 | 54 | 33 | 25 |
| RAL 1012 | Lemon yellow | | #DDAF27 | 174.04 | 221 | 175 | 39 | 47.12° | 70.52 | 49.22 | 73.615 | 4.946 | 68.938 | 0 | 18 | 83 | 16 | 46 |
| RAL 1013 | Oyster white | | #E3D9C6 | 218.12 | 227 | 217 | 198 | 43.85° | 30.23 | 83.14 | 87.152 | 0.27 | 10.431 | 0 | 3 | 12 | 12 | 70 |
| RAL 1014 | Ivory | | #DDC49A | 198.15 | 221 | 196 | 154 | 40.95° | 45.32 | 72.75 | 80.411 | 2.763 | 24.175 | 0 | 9 | 29 | 15 | 57 |
| RAL 1015 | Light ivory | | #E6D2B5 | 212.24 | 230 | 210 | 181 | 39.13° | 45.1 | 80 | 85.219 | 2.394 | 16.821 | 0 | 7 | 20 | 11 | 66 |
| RAL 1016 | Sulfur yellow | | #F1DD38 | 211.92 | 241 | 221 | 56 | 56.65° | 79.56 | 55.88 | 87.29 | −9.283 | 76.694 | 0 | 4 | 77 | 9 | 71 |
| RAL 1017 | Saffron yellow | | #F6A950 | 178.38 | 246 | 169 | 80 | 33.75° | 84.21 | 62.75 | 75.183 | 20.633 | 55.581 | 0 | 29 | 67 | 6 | 49 |
| RAL 1018 | Zinc yellow | | #FACA30 | 199.96 | 250 | 202 | 48 | 48.06° | 88.29 | 56.47 | 83.353 | 3.462 | 75.829 | 0 | 16 | 81 | 5 | 63 |
| RAL 1019 | Grey beige | | #A48F7A | 145.52 | 164 | 143 | 122 | 31.50° | 17.7 | 55.69 | 60.643 | 4.702 | 13.952 | 0 | 12 | 25 | 36 | 29 |
| RAL 1020 | Olive yellow | | #A08F65 | 142.94 | 160 | 143 | 101 | 45° | 22.22 | 50.59 | 59.883 | 0.56 | 24.683 | 0 | 9 | 36 | 38 | 28 |
| RAL 1021 | Colza yellow | | #F6B600 | 181.48 | 246 | 182 | 0 | 46.13° | 100 | 46.67 | 77.828 | 10.664 | 94.6 | 0 | 23 | 100 | 7 | 53 |
| RAL 1023 | Traffic yellow | | #F7B500 | 181.69 | 247 | 181 | 0 | 45.94° | 100 | 46.86 | 77.72 | 11.334 | 93.913 | 0 | 23 | 100 | 6 | 53 |
| RAL 1024 | Ochre yellow | | #BA8F4C | 146.88 | 186 | 143 | 76 | 39.06° | 41.73 | 50.2 | 62.261 | 8.491 | 41.488 | 0 | 20 | 59 | 29 | 31 |
| RAL 1026 | Luminous yellow | | #FFFF00 | 236.59 | 255 | 255 | 0 | 0.17° | 100 | 50 | 99.618 | −17.229 | 116.966 | 0 | 0 | 100 | 0 | 99 |
| RAL 1027 | Curry | | #A77F0E | 126.85 | 167 | 127 | 14 | 46.40° | 86.21 | 34.12 | 55.557 | 6.493 | 58.255 | 0 | 21 | 93 | 36 | 23 |
| RAL 1028 | Melon yellow | | #FF9B00 | 165.78 | 255 | 155 | 0 | 0.10° | 100 | 50 | 73.671 | 31.654 | 95.458 | 0 | 39 | 100 | 0 | 46 |
| RAL 1032 | Broom yellow | | #E2A300 | 163.85 | 226 | 163 | 0 | 44.93° | 100 | 42.94 | 71.135 | 12.766 | 74.772 | 0 | 25 | 100 | 14 | 42 |
| RAL 1033 | Dahlia yellow | | #F99A1C | 164.47 | 249 | 154 | 28 | 35.56° | 90 | 52.94 | 71.74 | 27.78 | 71.677 | 0 | 36 | 89 | 5 | 43 |
| RAL 1034 | Pastel yellow | | #EB9C52 | 167.03 | 235 | 156 | 82 | 30.60° | 74.87 | 60.98 | 70.94 | 22.91 | 49.962 | 0 | 32 | 65 | 10 | 42 |
| RAL 1035 | Pearl beige | | #908370 | 131.97 | 144 | 131 | 112 | 38° | 11.81 | 49.8 | 55.258 | 1.866 | 11.775 | 0 | 8 | 21 | 44 | —N/a |
| RAL 1036 | Pearl gold | | #80643F | 103.36 | 128 | 100 | 63 | 36.77° | 32.98 | 36.86 | 44.425 | 6.462 | 25.001 | 0 | 19 | 50 | 51 | —N/a |
| RAL 1037 | Sun yellow | | #F09200 | 154.88 | 240 | 146 | 0 | 37.69° | 100 | 45.88 | 68.889 | 27.62 | 74.504 | 0 | 37 | 100 | 8 | 39 |
| RAL 2000 | Yellow orange | | #DD7907 | 124.67 | 213 | 111 | 0 | 31.27° | 100 | 41.76 | 58.201 | 37.297 | 68.683 | 0 | 48 | 100 | 16 | 26 |
| RAL 2001 | Red orange | | #BE4E20 | 92.21 | 182 | 72 | 28 | 17.14° | 73.33 | 41.18 | 45.824 | 44.129 | 47.554 | 0 | 60 | 85 | 29 | 15 |
| RAL 2002 | Vermilion | | #C63927 | 82.55 | 188 | 56 | 35 | 8.24° | 68.61 | 43.73 | 44.441 | 52.797 | 43.768 | 0 | 70 | 81 | 26 | 14 |
| RAL 2003 | Pastel orange | | #FA842B | 140.02 | 241 | 120 | 41 | 23.70° | 87.72 | 55.29 | 64.235 | 44.142 | 61.832 | 0 | 50 | 83 | 5 | 33 |
| RAL 2004 | Pure orange | | #E75B12 | 106.99 | 222 | 83 | 6 | 21.39° | 94.74 | 44.71 | 54.448 | 53.586 | 63.716 | 0 | 63 | 97 | 13 | 22 |
| RAL 2005 | Luminous orange | | #FF2300 | 109.08 | 255 | 75 | 17 | 14.62° | 100 | 53.33 | 72.274 | 87.783 | 82.315 | 0 | 71 | 93 | 0 | 44 |
| RAL 2007 | Luminous bright orange | | #FFA421 | 185.09 | 255 | 183 | 0 | 0.12° | 100 | 50 | 88.914 | 52.782 | 97.982 | 0 | 28 | 100 | 0 | 74 |
| RAL 2008 | Bright red orange | | #F3752C | 128.30 | 232 | 107 | 34 | 22.12° | 81.15 | 52.16 | 60.334 | 46.913 | 60.652 | 0 | 54 | 85 | 9 | 28 |
| RAL 2009 | Traffic orange | | #E15501 | 106.43 | 218 | 83 | 10 | 21.06° | 91.23 | 44.71 | 53.766 | 51.886 | 62.145 | 0 | 62 | 95 | 15 | 22 |
| RAL 2010 | Signal orange | | #D4652F | 112.84 | 204 | 93 | 41 | 19.14° | 66.53 | 48.04 | 53.28 | 42.985 | 49.867 | 0 | 54 | 80 | 20 | 21 |
| RAL 2011 | Deep orange | | #EC7C25 | 126.74 | 221 | 110 | 15 | 27.67° | 87.29 | 46.27 | 59.241 | 40.856 | 64.504 | 0 | 50 | 93 | 13 | 27 |
| RAL 2012 | Salmon orange | | #DB6A50 | 122.30 | 209 | 101 | 78 | 10.53° | 58.74 | 56.27 | 56.085 | 42.492 | 34.021 | 0 | 52 | 63 | 18 | 24 |
| RAL 2013 | Pearl orange | | #954527 | 77.49 | 143 | 62 | 38 | 13.71° | 58.01 | 35.49 | 37.341 | 33.898 | 32.139 | 0 | 57 | 73 | 44 | —N/a |
| RAL 2017 | RAL orange | | #FA4402 | | 250 | 68 | 2 | | | | 56.5480 | 66.6210 | 67.5509 | 0 | 73 | 99 | 2 | |
| RAL 3000 | Flame red | | #AB2524 | 65.86 | 164 | 40 | 33 | 3.21° | 66.5 | 38.63 | 37.687 | 50.439 | 36.563 | 0 | 76 | 80 | 36 | 10 |
| RAL 3001 | Signal red | | #A02128 | 59.87 | 152 | 35 | 35 | 0° | 62.57 | 36.67 | 34.702 | 48.478 | 31.204 | 0 | 77 | 77 | 40 | 8 |
| RAL 3002 | Carmine red | | #A1232B | 59.09 | 152 | 34 | 34 | 0° | 63.44 | 36.47 | 34.458 | 48.832 | 31.869 | 0 | 78 | 78 | 40 | 8 |
| RAL 3003 | Ruby red | | #8D1D2C | 48.40 | 132 | 25 | 34 | 354.95° | 68.15 | 30.78 | 29.149 | 45.067 | 24.389 | 0 | 81 | 74 | 48 | 6 |
| RAL 3004 | Purple red | | #701F29 | 44.16 | 105 | 27 | 35 | 353.85° | 59.09 | 25.88 | 23.903 | 35.433 | 16.085 | 0 | 74 | 67 | 59 | 4 |
| RAL 3005 | Wine red | | #5E2028 | 38.11 | 88 | 24 | 31 | 353.44° | 57.14 | 21.96 | 19.699 | 30.019 | 12.525 | 0 | 73 | 65 | 65 | 3 |
| RAL 3007 | Black red | | #402225 | 38.31 | 61 | 32 | 34 | 355.86° | 31.18 | 18.24 | 16.437 | 14.617 | 5.268 | 0 | 48 | 44 | 76 | 2 |
| RAL 3009 | Oxide red | | #703731 | 58.98 | 102 | 48 | 41 | 6.89° | 42.66 | 28.04 | 27.272 | 24.588 | 16.512 | 0 | 53 | 60 | 60 | 5 |
| RAL 3011 | Brown red | | #7E292C | 53.65 | 119 | 36 | 36 | 0° | 53.55 | 30.39 | 27.966 | 36.64 | 21.316 | 0 | 70 | 70 | 53 | 5 |
| RAL 3012 | Beige red | | #CB8D73 | 144.24 | 194 | 133 | 109 | 16.94° | 41.06 | 59.41 | 61.394 | 22.436 | 22.979 | 0 | 31 | 44 | 24 | 30 |
| RAL 3013 | Tomato red | | #9C322E | 67.25 | 149 | 46 | 37 | 4.82° | 60.22 | 36.47 | 35.45 | 43.402 | 30.523 | 0 | 69 | 75 | 42 | 9 |
| RAL 3014 | Antique pink | | #D47479 | 133.43 | 201 | 115 | 117 | 358.60° | 44.33 | 61.96 | 58.26 | 34.939 | 14.085 | 0 | 43 | 42 | 21 | 26 |
| RAL 3015 | Light pink | | #E1A6AD | 172.13 | 215 | 160 | 166 | 353.45° | 40.74 | 73.53 | 71.232 | 21.595 | 4.983 | 0 | 26 | 23 | 16 | 43 |
| RAL 3016 | Coral red | | #AC4034 | 81.24 | 164 | 60 | 48 | 6.21° | 54.72 | 41.57 | 40.678 | 42.925 | 30.919 | 0 | 63 | 71 | 36 | 12 |
| RAL 3017 | Rose | | #D3545F | 109.31 | 200 | 84 | 93 | 355.34° | 51.33 | 55.69 | 51.708 | 47.655 | 19.335 | 0 | 58 | 53 | 22 | 20 |
| RAL 3018 | Strawberry red | | #D14152 | 91.35 | 196 | 62 | 74 | 354.63° | 53.17 | 50.59 | 47.141 | 54.458 | 24.604 | 0 | 68 | 62 | 23 | 16 |
| RAL 3020 | Traffic red | | #C1121C | 61.23 | 184 | 29 | 19 | 3.64° | 81.28 | 39.8 | 40.511 | 59.32 | 47.967 | 0 | 84 | 90 | 28 | 12 |
| RAL 3022 | Salmon pink | | #D56D56 | 124.60 | 204 | 105 | 85 | 10.08° | 53.85 | 56.67 | 56.056 | 38.9 | 29.704 | 0 | 49 | 58 | 20 | 24 |
| RAL 3024 | Luminous red | | #F70000 | 86.85 | 255 | 42 | 36 | 1.64° | 100 | 57.06 | 61.253 | 83.212 | 65.195 | 0 | 84 | 86 | 0 | 30 |
| RAL 3026 | Luminous bright red | | #FF0000 | 83.70 | 255 | 38 | 32 | 1.61° | 100 | 56.27 | 63.701 | 87.132 | 70.01 | 0 | 85 | 87 | 0 | 32 |
| RAL 3027 | Raspberry red | | #B42041 | 67.51 | 169 | 38 | 61 | 349.47° | 63.29 | 40.59 | 38.686 | 53.68 | 20.868 | 0 | 78 | 64 | 34 | 10 |
| RAL 3028 | Pure red | | #E72512 | 76.23 | 201 | 43 | 38 | 1.84° | 68.2 | 46.86 | 45.358 | 60.958 | 44.231 | 0 | 79 | 81 | 21 | 15 |
| RAL 3031 | Orient red | | #AC323B | 75.38 | 164 | 51 | 56 | 357.35° | 52.56 | 42.16 | 39.32 | 47.086 | 24.708 | 0 | 69 | 66 | 36 | 11 |
| RAL 3032 | Pearl ruby red | | #711521 | 46.01 | 110 | 28 | 36 | 354.15° | 59.42 | 27.06 | 25.034 | 36.705 | 17.139 | 0 | 75 | 67 | 57 | —N/a |
| RAL 3033 | Pearl pink | | #B24C43 | 78.53 | 162 | 57 | 46 | 5.69° | 55.77 | 40.78 | 39.808 | 43.686 | 30.991 | 0 | 65 | 72 | 36 | —N/a |
| RAL 4001 | Red lilac | | #8A5A83 | 105.97 | 131 | 96 | 131 | 0.83° | 15.42 | 44.51 | 45.333 | 19.568 | −14.009 | 0 | 27 | 0 | 49 | 15 |
| RAL 4002 | Red violet | | #933D50 | 78.09 | 140 | 60 | 75 | 348.75° | 40 | 39.22 | 36.8 | 35.858 | 8.343 | 0 | 57 | 46 | 45 | 9 |
| RAL 4003 | Heather violet | | #D15B8F | 120.44 | 196 | 96 | 140 | 333.60° | 45.87 | 57.25 | 54.247 | 44.659 | −5.015 | 0 | 51 | 29 | 23 | 22 |
| RAL 4004 | Claret violet | | #691639 | 46.12 | 100 | 29 | 57 | 336.34° | 55.04 | 25.29 | 23.577 | 34.298 | 0.517 | 0 | 71 | 43 | 61 | 4 |
| RAL 4005 | Blue lilac | | #83639D | 110.93 | 123 | 103 | 154 | 263.53° | 20.16 | 50.39 | 47.024 | 16.762 | −25.226 | 20 | 33 | 0 | 40 | 16 |
| RAL 4006 | Traffic purple | | #992572 | 73.46 | 145 | 48 | 115 | 318.56° | 50.26 | 37.84 | 36.964 | 46.56 | −16.759 | 0 | 67 | 21 | 43 | 10 |
| RAL 4007 | Purple violet | | #4A203B | 45.17 | 71 | 36 | 60 | 318.86° | 32.71 | 20.98 | 19.721 | 20.17 | −7.946 | 0 | 49 | 15 | 72 | 3 |
| RAL 4008 | Signal violet | | #904684 | 91.80 | 135 | 75 | 131 | 304° | 28.57 | 41.18 | 40.761 | 32.526 | −20.561 | 0 | 44 | 3 | 47 | 12 |
| RAL 4009 | Pastel violet | | #A38995 | 139.04 | 157 | 133 | 146 | 327.50° | 10.91 | 56.86 | 58.22 | 11.056 | −3.283 | 0 | 15 | 7 | 38 | 26 |
| RAL 4010 | Telemagenta | | #C63678 | 92.69 | 187 | 62 | 119 | 332.64° | 50.2 | 48.82 | 46.538 | 54.36 | −4.083 | 0 | 67 | 36 | 27 | 16 |
| RAL 4011 | Pearl violet | | #8773A1 | 103.86 | 113 | 98 | 135 | 264.32° | 15.88 | 45.69 | 44.108 | 12.383 | −18.407 | 16 | 27 | 0 | 47 | —N/a |
| RAL 4012 | Pearl blackberry | | #6B6880 | 108.87 | 109 | 107 | 127 | 246° | 8.55 | 45.88 | 45.891 | 4.098 | −11.086 | 14 | 16 | 0 | 50 | —N/a |
| RAL 5000 | Violet blue | | #384C70 | 75.71 | 56 | 78 | 111 | 216° | 32.93 | 32.75 | 32.585 | −1.282 | −21.686 | 50 | 30 | 0 | 56 | 7 |
| RAL 5001 | Green blue | | #1F4764 | 67.74 | 29 | 76 | 100 | 200.28° | 55.04 | 25.29 | 29.866 | −9.761 | −19.22 | 71 | 24 | 0 | 61 | 6 |
| RAL 5002 | Ultramarine blue | | #2B2C7C | 53.88 | 30 | 54 | 123 | 224.52° | 60.78 | 30 | 24.179 | 11.008 | −42.748 | 76 | 56 | 0 | 52 | 4 |
| RAL 5003 | Sapphire blue | | #2A3756 | 54.27 | 38 | 56 | 85 | 217.02° | 38.21 | 24.12 | 22.956 | 0.076 | −20.213 | 55 | 34 | 0 | 67 | 4 |
| RAL 5004 | Black blue | | #1D1F2A | 29.87 | 26 | 30 | 40 | 222.86° | 21.21 | 12.94 | 11.174 | 0.654 | −7.457 | 35 | 25 | 0 | 84 | 1 |
| RAL 5005 | Signal blue | | #154889 | 67.68 | 0 | 81 | 135 | 204° | 100 | 26.47 | 32.448 | −6.68 | −37.201 | 100 | 40 | 0 | 47 | 7 |
| RAL 5007 | Brilliant blue | | #41678D | 99.95 | 66 | 106 | 140 | 207.57° | 35.92 | 40.39 | 42.929 | −6.8 | −23.609 | 53 | 24 | 0 | 45 | 13 |
| RAL 5008 | Grey blue | | #313C48 | 55.96 | 45 | 58 | 68 | 206.09° | 20.35 | 22.16 | 23.463 | −3.174 | −8.172 | 34 | 15 | 0 | 73 | 4 |
| RAL 5009 | Azure blue | | #2E5978 | 85.46 | 45 | 94 | 120 | 200.80° | 45.45 | 32.35 | 37.421 | −10.799 | −19.905 | 62 | 22 | 0 | 53 | 10 |
| RAL 5010 | Gentian blue | | #13447C | 64.74 | 0 | 78 | 124 | 202.26° | 100 | 24.31 | 30.95 | −7.433 | −32.954 | 100 | 37 | 0 | 51 | 7 |
| RAL 5011 | Steel blue | | #232C3F | 41.54 | 30 | 43 | 61 | 214.84° | 34.07 | 17.84 | 16.969 | −1.198 | −13.154 | 51 | 30 | 0 | 76 | 2 |
| RAL 5012 | Light blue | | #3481B8 | 120.19 | 46 | 136 | 182 | 200.29° | 59.65 | 44.71 | 53.135 | −15.219 | −32.486 | 75 | 25 | 0 | 29 | 21 |
| RAL 5013 | Cobalt blue | | #232D53 | 47.55 | 34 | 48 | 83 | 222.86° | 41.88 | 22.94 | 20.044 | 2.964 | −23.406 | 59 | 42 | 0 | 67 | 3 |
| RAL 5014 | Pigeon blue | | #6C7C98 | 121.63 | 104 | 124 | 150 | 213.91° | 18.11 | 49.8 | 51.233 | −2.817 | −16.741 | 31 | 17 | 0 | 41 | 19 |
| RAL 5015 | Sky blue | | #2874B2 | 103.02 | 11 | 123 | 176 | 199.27° | 88.24 | 36.67 | 48.193 | −13.907 | −36.485 | 94 | 30 | 0 | 31 | 17 |
| RAL 5017 | Traffic blue | | #0E518D | 74.48 | 0 | 90 | 140 | 201.43° | 100 | 27.45 | 34.824 | −13.495 | −36.357 | 100 | 36 | 0 | 45 | 8 |
| RAL 5018 | Turquoise blue | | #21888F | 115.26 | 27 | 139 | 140 | 180.53° | 67.66 | 32.75 | 52.285 | −30.312 | −9.335 | 81 | 1 | 0 | 45 | 20 |
| RAL 5019 | Capri blue | | #1A5784 | 79.23 | 15 | 93 | 132 | 200° | 79.59 | 28.82 | 36.615 | −11.411 | −28.473 | 89 | 30 | 0 | 48 | 9 |
| RAL 5020 | Ocean blue | | #0B4151 | 51.90 | 0 | 65 | 75 | 188° | 100 | 14.71 | 23.75 | −20.682 | −12.512 | 100 | 13 | 0 | 71 | 4 |
| RAL 5021 | Water blue | | #07737A | 92.27 | 0 | 117 | 119 | 181.01° | 100 | 23.33 | 43.325 | −33.797 | −10.417 | 100 | 2 | 0 | 53 | 13 |
| RAL 5022 | Night blue | | #2F2A5A | 47.11 | 43 | 44 | 90 | 238.72° | 35.34 | 26.08 | 19.872 | 10.632 | −28.485 | 52 | 51 | 0 | 65 | 3 |
| RAL 5023 | Distant blue | | #4D668E | 100.29 | 74 | 104 | 141 | 213.13° | 31.16 | 42.16 | 43.013 | −3.442 | −23.737 | 48 | 26 | 0 | 45 | 13 |
| RAL 5024 | Pastel blue | | #6A93B0 | 138.74 | 103 | 146 | 172 | 202.61° | 29.36 | 53.92 | 58.295 | −10.309 | −18.647 | 40 | 15 | 0 | 33 | 26 |
| RAL 5025 | Pearl Gentian blue | | #296478 | 93.40 | 44 | 105 | 124 | 194.25° | 47.62 | 32.94 | 41.102 | −15.762 | −16.748 | 65 | 15 | 0 | 51 | —N/a |
| RAL 5026 | Pearl night blue | | #102C54 | 45.28 | 27 | 47 | 82 | 218.18° | 50.46 | 21.37 | 19.227 | 1.728 | −24.359 | 67 | 43 | 0 | 68 | —N/a |
| RAL 6000 | Patina green | | #327662 | 102.44 | 59 | 116 | 96 | 158.95° | 32.57 | 34.31 | 44.529 | −23.651 | 5.316 | 49 | 0 | 17 | 55 | 14 |
| RAL 6001 | Emerald green | | #28713E | 88.55 | 49 | 104 | 52 | 123.27° | 35.95 | 30 | 39.247 | −28.094 | 23.342 | 53 | 0 | 50 | 59 | 11 |
| RAL 6002 | Leaf green | | #276235 | 76.75 | 45 | 90 | 39 | 112.94° | 39.53 | 25.29 | 34.079 | −24.697 | 23.999 | 50 | 0 | 57 | 65 | 8 |
| RAL 6003 | Olive green | | #4B573E | 80.20 | 78 | 83 | 59 | 72.50° | 16.9 | 27.84 | 34.335 | −5.296 | 13.147 | 6 | 0 | 29 | 67 | 8 |
| RAL 6004 | Blue green | | #0E4243 | 55.10 | 8 | 68 | 66 | 178° | 78.95 | 14.9 | 25.484 | −19.095 | −4.31 | 88 | 0 | 3 | 73 | 5 |
| RAL 6005 | Moss green | | #0F4336 | 54.43 | 17 | 66 | 50 | 160.41° | 59.04 | 16.27 | 24.439 | −20.569 | 4.665 | 74 | 0 | 24 | 74 | 4 |
| RAL 6006 | Grey olive | | #40433B | 56.63 | 59 | 57 | 46 | 50.77° | 12.38 | 20.59 | 24.036 | −1.163 | 7.105 | 0 | 3 | 22 | 77 | 4 |
| RAL 6007 | Bottle green | | #283424 | 47.14 | 42 | 50 | 34 | 90° | 19.05 | 16.47 | 19.792 | −6.46 | 9.562 | 16 | 0 | 32 | 80 | 3 |
| RAL 6008 | Brown green | | #35382E | 51.70 | 54 | 52 | 42 | 50° | 12.5 | 18.82 | 21.675 | −0.827 | 6.489 | 0 | 4 | 22 | 79 | 3 |
| RAL 6009 | Fir green | | #26392F | 49.94 | 39 | 54 | 42 | 132° | 16.13 | 18.24 | 20.78 | −8.546 | 5.213 | 28 | 0 | 22 | 79 | 3 |
| RAL 6010 | Grass green | | #3E753B | 98.74 | 72 | 111 | 56 | 102.55° | 32.93 | 32.75 | 42.993 | −22.872 | 26.093 | 35 | 0 | 50 | 56 | 13 |
| RAL 6011 | Reseda green | | #68825B | 118.08 | 105 | 125 | 88 | 92.43° | 17.37 | 41.76 | 49.931 | −12.896 | 17.344 | 16 | 0 | 30 | 51 | 18 |
| RAL 6012 | Black green | | #31403D | 58.02 | 48 | 61 | 58 | 166.15° | 11.93 | 21.37 | 24.554 | −6.234 | −0.13 | 21 | 0 | 5 | 76 | 4 |
| RAL 6013 | Reed green | | #797C5A | 116.83 | 122 | 118 | 90 | 52.50° | 15.09 | 41.57 | 49.493 | −2.158 | 16.371 | 0 | 3 | 26 | 52 | 18 |
| RAL 6014 | Yellow olive | | #444337 | 65.20 | 70 | 65 | 53 | 42.35° | 13.82 | 24.12 | 27.639 | 0.59 | 7.89 | 0 | 7 | 24 | 73 | 5 |
| RAL 6015 | Black olive | | #3D403A | 60.28 | 60 | 61 | 54 | 68.57° | 6.09 | 22.55 | 25.484 | −1.59 | 4.15 | 2 | 0 | 11 | 76 | 5 |
| RAL 6016 | Turquoise green | | #026A52 | 81.30 | 0 | 106 | 76 | 163.02° | 100 | 20.78 | 38.439 | −39.355 | 8.026 | 100 | 0 | 28 | 58 | 10 |
| RAL 6017 | May green | | #468641 | 113.74 | 83 | 128 | 63 | 101.54° | 34.03 | 37.45 | 49.029 | −25.488 | 29.753 | 35 | 0 | 51 | 50 | 18 |
| RAL 6018 | Yellow green | | #48A43F | 133.18 | 89 | 154 | 57 | 100.21° | 45.97 | 41.37 | 57.587 | −35.153 | 42.334 | 42 | 0 | 63 | 40 | 26 |
| RAL 6019 | Pastel green | | #B7D9B1 | 198.66 | 183 | 206 | 172 | 100.59° | 25.76 | 74.12 | 80.385 | −13.069 | 14.476 | 11 | 0 | 17 | 19 | 57 |
| RAL 6020 | Chrome green | | #354733 | 62.08 | 54 | 66 | 47 | 97.89° | 16.81 | 22.16 | 26.338 | −8.365 | 10.002 | 18 | 0 | 29 | 74 | 5 |
| RAL 6021 | Pale green | | #86A47C | 147.43 | 135 | 154 | 119 | 92.57° | 14.77 | 53.53 | 61.305 | −11.717 | 16.056 | 12 | 0 | 23 | 40 | 30 |
| RAL 6022 | Olive-drab/brown olive | | #3E3C32 | 51.41 | 57 | 51 | 39 | 40° | 18.75 | 18.82 | 21.685 | 1.103 | 8.802 | 0 | 11 | 32 | 78 | 3 |
| RAL 6024 | Traffic green | | #008754 | 100.18 | 0 | 132 | 80 | 156.36° | 100 | 25.88 | 47.925 | −44.563 | 18.534 | 100 | 0 | 39 | 48 | 17 |
| RAL 6025 | Fern green | | #53753C | 102.07 | 90 | 110 | 59 | 83.53° | 30.18 | 33.14 | 43.932 | −15.048 | 26.076 | 18 | 0 | 46 | 57 | 14 |
| RAL 6026 | Opal green | | #005D52 | 73.58 | 0 | 95 | 78 | 169.26° | 100 | 18.63 | 34.35 | −36.57 | 0.829 | 100 | 0 | 18 | 63 | 8 |
| RAL 6027 | Light green | | #81C0BB | 173.31 | 128 | 186 | 181 | 174.83° | 29.59 | 61.57 | 71.56 | −20.503 | −3.86 | 31 | 0 | 3 | 27 | 43 |
| RAL 6028 | Pine green | | #2D5546 | 75.05 | 48 | 84 | 66 | 150° | 27.27 | 25.88 | 32.5 | −17.091 | 6.069 | 43 | 0 | 21 | 67 | 7 |
| RAL 6029 | Mint green | | #007243 | 84.43 | 0 | 112 | 60 | 152.14° | 100 | 21.96 | 39.92 | −47.213 | 19.273 | 100 | 0 | 46 | 56 | 11 |
| RAL 6032 | Signal green | | #0F8558 | 103.35 | 28 | 128 | 81 | 151.80° | 64.1 | 30.59 | 47.236 | −37.788 | 16.942 | 78 | 0 | 37 | 50 | 16 |
| RAL 6033 | Mint turquoise | | #478A84 | 121.03 | 72 | 135 | 127 | 172.38° | 30.43 | 40.59 | 51.934 | −22.925 | −2.331 | 47 | 0 | 6 | 47 | 20 |
| RAL 6034 | Pastel turquoise | | #7FB0B2 | 162.51 | 124 | 173 | 172 | 178.78° | 23 | 58.24 | 67.128 | −16.7 | −5.213 | 28 | 0 | 1 | 32 | 37 |
| RAL 6035 | Pearl green | | #1B542C | 61.71 | 19 | 77 | 36 | 137.59° | 60.42 | 18.82 | 28.366 | −27.124 | 18.409 | 75 | 0 | 53 | 70 | —N/a |
| RAL 6036 | Pearl opal green | | #005D4C | 69.84 | 7 | 88 | 75 | 170.37° | 85.26 | 18.63 | 32.729 | −25.854 | 0.881 | 92 | 0 | 15 | 65 | —N/a |
| RAL 6037 | Pure green | | #25E712 | 102.94 | 0 | 140 | 39 | 136.71° | 100 | 27.45 | 50.209 | −53.031 | 41.386 | 100 | 0 | 72 | 45 | 19 |
| RAL 6038 | Luminous green | | #00F700 | 131.47 | 0 | 182 | 18 | 125.93° | 100 | 35.69 | 62.308 | −84.293 | 57.548 | 100 | 0 | 90 | 29 | 31 |
| RAL 7000 | Squirrel grey | | #7E8B92 | 133.67 | 123 | 136 | 142 | 198.95° | 7.76 | 51.96 | 55.673 | −3.552 | −4.905 | 13 | 4 | 0 | 44 | 24 |
| RAL 7001 | Silver grey | | #8F999F | 148.80 | 142 | 150 | 157 | 208° | 7.11 | 58.63 | 61.648 | −2.346 | −4.456 | 10 | 4 | 0 | 38 | 30 |
| RAL 7002 | Olive grey | | #817F68 | 119.97 | 127 | 120 | 99 | 45° | 12.39 | 44.31 | 50.775 | −0.044 | 12.64 | 0 | 6 | 22 | 50 | 19 |
| RAL 7003 | Moss grey | | #7A7B6D | 118.20 | 120 | 119 | 105 | 56° | 6.67 | 44.12 | 49.694 | −1.244 | 7.793 | 0 | 1 | 13 | 53 | 18 |
| RAL 7004 | Signal grey | | #9EA0A1 | 155.00 | 155 | 155 | 155 | 0.61° | 0 | 60.78 | 63.832 | 0.185 | −0.439 | 0 | 0 | 0 | 39 | 33 |
| RAL 7005 | Mouse grey | | #6B716F | 109.15 | 107 | 110 | 107 | 120° | 1.38 | 42.55 | 46.213 | −1.581 | 1.174 | 3 | 0 | 3 | 57 | 15 |
| RAL 7006 | Beige grey | | #756F61 | 107.47 | 117 | 106 | 94 | 31.30° | 10.9 | 41.37 | 45.607 | 2.498 | 8.713 | 0 | 9 | 20 | 54 | 15 |
| RAL 7008 | Khaki grey | | #746643 | 96.51 | 114 | 95 | 60 | 38.89° | 31.03 | 34.12 | 41.485 | 4.118 | 22.658 | 0 | 17 | 47 | 55 | 12 |
| RAL 7009 | Green grey | | #5B6259 | 94.57 | 92 | 96 | 88 | 90° | 4.35 | 36.08 | 40.2 | −2.864 | 4.187 | 4 | 0 | 8 | 62 | 11 |
| RAL 7010 | Tarpaulin grey | | #575D57 | 90.72 | 88 | 92 | 86 | 100° | 3.37 | 34.9 | 38.442 | −2.331 | 2.593 | 4 | 0 | 7 | 64 | 10 |
| RAL 7011 | Iron grey | | #555D61 | 88.01 | 83 | 89 | 93 | 204° | 5.68 | 34.51 | 37.44 | −2.068 | −3.02 | 11 | 4 | 0 | 64 | 10 |
| RAL 7012 | Basalt grey | | #596163 | 92.01 | 88 | 93 | 94 | 190° | 3.3 | 35.69 | 39.159 | −2.027 | −1.452 | 6 | 1 | 0 | 63 | 11 |
| RAL 7013 | Brown grey | | #555548 | 80.41 | 86 | 80 | 68 | 40° | 11.69 | 30.2 | 34.343 | 0.836 | 8.009 | 0 | 7 | 21 | 66 | 8 |
| RAL 7015 | Slate grey | | #51565C | 82.80 | 80 | 83 | 89 | 220° | 5.33 | 33.14 | 35.155 | −0.229 | −3.737 | 10 | 7 | 0 | 65 | 9 |
| RAL 7016 | Anthracite grey | | #373F43 | 61.01 | 56 | 62 | 66 | 204° | 8.2 | 23.92 | 25.926 | −1.853 | −3.407 | 15 | 6 | 0 | 74 | 5 |
| RAL 7021 | Black grey | | #2E3234 | 49.72 | 48 | 50 | 52 | 210° | 4 | 19.61 | 20.639 | −0.806 | −1.325 | 8 | 4 | 0 | 80 | 3 |
| RAL 7022 | Umbra grey | | #4B4D46 | 73.99 | 76 | 74 | 68 | 45° | 5.56 | 28.24 | 31.372 | −0.001 | 3.652 | 0 | 3 | 11 | 70 | 7 |
| RAL 7023 | Concrete grey | | #818479 | 127.07 | 127 | 128 | 118 | 66° | 4.07 | 48.24 | 53.265 | −1.634 | 5.038 | 1 | 0 | 8 | 50 | 21 |
| RAL 7024 | Graphite grey | | #474A50 | 72.80 | 70 | 73 | 79 | 220° | 6.04 | 29.22 | 30.964 | −0.314 | −3.685 | 11 | 8 | 0 | 69 | 7 |
| RAL 7026 | Granite grey | | #374447 | 64.81 | 56 | 67 | 69 | 189.23° | 10.4 | 24.51 | 27.434 | −4.013 | −3.107 | 19 | 3 | 0 | 73 | 5 |
| RAL 7030 | Stone grey | | #939388 | 141.99 | 145 | 142 | 133 | 45° | 5.17 | 54.51 | 59.041 | −0.114 | 5.3 | 0 | 2 | 8 | 43 | 27 |
| RAL 7031 | Blue grey | | #5D6970 | 102.02 | 93 | 104 | 109 | 198.75° | 7.92 | 39.61 | 43.16 | −3.593 | −4.523 | 15 | 5 | 0 | 57 | 13 |
| RAL 7032 | Pebble grey | | #B9B9A8 | 175.77 | 180 | 176 | 161 | 47.37° | 11.24 | 66.86 | 71.941 | −0.909 | 8.469 | 0 | 2 | 11 | 29 | 44 |
| RAL 7033 | Cement grey | | #818979 | 128.14 | 126 | 130 | 116 | 77.14° | 5.69 | 48.24 | 53.842 | −3.737 | 7.189 | 3 | 0 | 11 | 49 | 22 |
| RAL 7034 | Yellow grey | | #939176 | 135.90 | 144 | 136 | 111 | 0.13° | 12.94 | 50 | 56.857 | 0.031 | 14.835 | 0 | 6 | 23 | 44 | 25 |
| RAL 7035 | Light grey | | #CBD0CC | 198.36 | 197 | 199 | 196 | 100° | 2.61 | 77.45 | 80.047 | −1.207 | 1.387 | 1 | 0 | 2 | 22 | 57 |
| RAL 7036 | Platinum grey | | #9A9697 | 147.78 | 151 | 147 | 146 | 12° | 2.35 | 58.24 | 61.233 | 1.346 | 1.022 | 0 | 3 | 3 | 41 | 30 |
| RAL 7037 | Dusty grey | | #7C7F7E | 122.72 | 122 | 123 | 122 | 120° | 0.41 | 48.04 | 51.431 | −0.642 | 0.533 | 1 | 0 | 1 | 52 | 20 |
| RAL 7038 | Agate grey | | #B4B8B0 | 176.00 | 175 | 177 | 169 | 75° | 4.88 | 67.84 | 71.73 | −1.62 | 3.82 | 1 | 0 | 5 | 31 | 43 |
| RAL 7039 | Quartz grey | | #6B695F | 102.27 | 106 | 102 | 94 | 40° | 6 | 39.22 | 43.496 | 0.373 | 5.56 | 0 | 4 | 11 | 58 | 13 |
| RAL 7040 | Window grey | | #9DA3A6 | 156.94 | 152 | 158 | 161 | 200° | 4.57 | 61.37 | 64.7 | −1.517 | −2.498 | 6 | 2 | 0 | 37 | 34 |
| RAL 7042 | Traffic grey A | | #8F9695 | 145.08 | 142 | 146 | 145 | 165° | 1.8 | 56.47 | 60.149 | −1.676 | 0.035 | 3 | 0 | 1 | 43 | 28 |
| RAL 7043 | Traffic grey B | | #4E5451 | 81.22 | 79 | 82 | 80 | 140° | 1.86 | 31.57 | 34.565 | −1.532 | 0.596 | 4 | 0 | 2 | 68 | 8 |
| RAL 7044 | Silk grey | | #BDBDB2 | 178.84 | 182 | 179 | 168 | 47.14° | 8.75 | 68.63 | 72.904 | −0.082 | 5.939 | 0 | 2 | 8 | 29 | 45 |
| RAL 7045 | Telegrey 1 | | #91969A | 145.37 | 142 | 146 | 149 | 205.71° | 3.2 | 57.06 | 60.348 | −1.428 | −1.836 | 5 | 2 | 0 | 42 | 29 |
| RAL 7046 | Telegrey 2 | | #82898E | 132.80 | 127 | 134 | 138 | 201.82° | 4.49 | 51.96 | 55.438 | −1.833 | −3.188 | 8 | 3 | 0 | 46 | 23 |
| RAL 7047 | Telegrey 4 | | #CFD0CF | 199.93 | 200 | 200 | 199 | 0.17° | 0.9 | 78.24 | 80.668 | −0.266 | 0.82 | 0 | 0 | 0 | 22 | 58 |
| RAL 7048 | Pearl mouse grey | | #888175 | 123.49 | 128 | 123 | 115 | 36.92° | 5.35 | 47.65 | 51.991 | 0.679 | 5.105 | 0 | 4 | 10 | 50 | —N/a |
| RAL 8000 | Green brown | | #887142 | 108.78 | 134 | 106 | 62 | 36.67° | 36.73 | 38.43 | 46.778 | 7.583 | 28.693 | 0 | 21 | 54 | 47 | 16 |
| RAL 8001 | Ochre brown | | #9C6B30 | 106.44 | 153 | 99 | 43 | 30.55° | 56.12 | 38.43 | 47.08 | 18.952 | 39.867 | 0 | 35 | 72 | 40 | 16 |
| RAL 8002 | Signal brown | | #7B5141 | 84.85 | 119 | 77 | 62 | 15.79° | 31.49 | 35.49 | 37.391 | 16.881 | 16.707 | 0 | 35 | 48 | 53 | 10 |
| RAL 8003 | Clay brown | | #80542F | 82.82 | 124 | 75 | 39 | 25.41° | 52.15 | 31.96 | 37.148 | 18.589 | 30.287 | 0 | 40 | 69 | 51 | 10 |
| RAL 8004 | Copper brown | | #8F4E35 | 85.09 | 138 | 73 | 49 | 16.18° | 47.59 | 36.67 | 38.964 | 26.631 | 27.038 | 0 | 47 | 64 | 46 | 11 |
| RAL 8007 | Fawn brown | | #6F4A2F | 76.34 | 109 | 70 | 43 | 24.55° | 43.42 | 29.8 | 33.824 | 15.336 | 23.6 | 0 | 36 | 61 | 57 | 8 |
| RAL 8008 | Olive brown | | #6F4F28 | 79.19 | 111 | 74 | 37 | 30° | 50 | 29.02 | 35.151 | 13.225 | 28.492 | 0 | 33 | 67 | 56 | 9 |
| RAL 8011 | Nut brown | | #5A3A29 | 61.58 | 88 | 56 | 39 | 20.82° | 38.58 | 24.9 | 27.125 | 13.264 | 17.081 | 0 | 36 | 56 | 65 | 5 |
| RAL 8012 | Red brown | | #673831 | 60.84 | 100 | 51 | 43 | 8.42° | 39.86 | 28.04 | 27.74 | 22.005 | 15.201 | 0 | 49 | 57 | 61 | 5 |
| RAL 8014 | Sepia brown | | #49392D | 55.96 | 72 | 53 | 38 | 26.47° | 30.91 | 21.57 | 24.029 | 7.289 | 12.866 | 0 | 26 | 47 | 72 | 4 |
| RAL 8015 | Chestnut brown | | #633A34 | 56.20 | 93 | 47 | 39 | 8.89° | 40.91 | 25.88 | 25.491 | 20.675 | 15.127 | 0 | 49 | 58 | 64 | 5 |
| RAL 8016 | Mahogany brown | | #4C2F26 | 49.01 | 75 | 43 | 32 | 15.35° | 40.19 | 20.98 | 21.4 | 14.371 | 13.84 | 0 | 43 | 57 | 71 | 3 |
| RAL 8017 | Chocolate brown | | #44322D | 50.82 | 67 | 47 | 41 | 13.85° | 24.07 | 21.18 | 21.544 | 8.972 | 7.368 | 0 | 30 | 39 | 74 | 3 |
| RAL 8019 | Grey brown | | #3F3A3A | 55.42 | 61 | 54 | 53 | 7.50° | 7.02 | 22.35 | 23.321 | 2.993 | 1.467 | 0 | 11 | 13 | 76 | 4 |
| RAL 8022 | Black brown | | #211F20 | 23.78 | 26 | 23 | 25 | 320° | 6.12 | 9.61 | 8.139 | 1.932 | −0.585 | 0 | 12 | 4 | 90 | 1 |
| RAL 8023 | Orange brown | | #A65E2F | 99.20 | 160 | 87 | 41 | 23.19° | 59.2 | 39.41 | 45.42 | 28.236 | 39.65 | 0 | 46 | 74 | 37 | 15 |
| RAL 8024 | Beige brown | | #79553C | 86.35 | 118 | 80 | 56 | 23.23° | 35.63 | 34.12 | 38.036 | 14.136 | 20.822 | 0 | 32 | 53 | 54 | 10 |
| RAL 8025 | Pale brown | | #755C49 | 92.51 | 115 | 88 | 71 | 23.18° | 23.66 | 36.47 | 39.85 | 9.63 | 14.49 | 0 | 23 | 38 | 55 | 11 |
| RAL 8028 | Terra brown | | #4E3B2B | 61.31 | 79 | 58 | 42 | 25.95° | 30.58 | 23.73 | 26.58 | 7.884 | 13.812 | 0 | 27 | 47 | 69 | 5 |
| RAL 8029 | Pearl copper | | #773C27 | 75.89 | 125 | 64 | 49 | 11.84° | 43.68 | 34.12 | 34.763 | 26.058 | 21.392 | 0 | 49 | 61 | 51 | —N/a |
| RAL 9001 | Cream | | #EFEBDC | 225.19 | 233 | 224 | 210 | 42.86° | 30.43 | 86.47 | 89.616 | 0.594 | 8.06 | 0 | 3 | 9 | 9 | 75 |
| RAL 9002 | Grey white | | #DDDED4 | 212.49 | 215 | 213 | 203 | 54.55° | 11.83 | 81.76 | 85.07 | −1.04 | 5.18 | 0 | 0 | 5 | 16 | 66 |
| RAL 9003 | Signal white | | #F4F8F4 | 235.64 | 236 | 236 | 231 | 0.17° | 11.63 | 91.57 | 93.223 | −0.644 | 2.45 | 0 | 0 | 2 | 7 | 83 |
| RAL 9004 | Signal black | | #2E3032 | 43.07 | 43 | 43 | 44 | 240° | 1.15 | 17.06 | 17.464 | 0.429 | −0.837 | 2 | 2 | 0 | 83 | 2 |
| RAL 9005 | Jet black | | #0A0A0D | 14.14 | 14 | 14 | 16 | 240° | 6.67 | 5.88 | 4.041 | 0.091 | −0.873 | 12 | 12 | 0 | 94 | 0 |
| RAL 9006 | White aluminium | | #A5A8A6 | 160.93 | 161 | 161 | 160 | 0.17° | 0.53 | 62.94 | 66.321 | −0.347 | 0.545 | 0 | 0 | 1 | 37 | —N/a |
| RAL 9007 | Grey aluminium | | #8F8F8C | 132.92 | 135 | 133 | 129 | 48° | 2.02 | 51.57 | 55.547 | −0.061 | 2.142 | 0 | 1 | 4 | 47 | —N/a |
| RAL 9010 | Pure white | | #F7F9EF | 236.77 | 241 | 236 | 225 | 48° | 33.33 | 91.18 | 93.613 | −0.425 | 6.008 | 0 | 1 | 6 | 6 | 84 |
| RAL 9011 | Graphite black | | #1C1C1C | 40.72 | 39 | 41 | 43 | 210° | 4.88 | 16.08 | 16.572 | −0.383 | −1.735 | 9 | 5 | 0 | 83 | 2 |
| RAL 9012 | Clean room white | | #FFFDE6 | | 255 | 253 | 230 | | | | 98.9164 | -3.1649 | 11.2367 | 0 | 1 | 10 | 0 | |
| RAL 9016 | Traffic white | | #F7FBF5 | 240.28 | 241 | 240 | 234 | 68.57° | 20 | 93.14 | 94.843 | −0.921 | 3.28 | 0 | 0 | 3 | 5 | 87 |
| RAL 9017 | Traffic black | | #2A2D2F | 41.28 | 42 | 41 | 42 | 0.83° | 1.2 | 16.27 | 16.521 | 0.709 | −0.582 | 0 | 2 | 0 | 84 | 2 |
| RAL 9018 | Papyrus white | | #CFD3CD | 201.64 | 200 | 203 | 196 | 94.29° | 6.31 | 78.24 | 81.343 | −2.293 | 2.956 | 2 | 0 | 3 | 20 | 59 |
| RAL 9022 | Pearl light grey | | #858583 | 132.86 | 133 | 133 | 131 | 0.17° | 0.81 | 51.76 | 55.474 | −0.381 | 1.165 | 0 | 0 | 2 | 48 | —N/a |
| RAL 9023 | Pearl dark grey | | #7E8182 | 122.57 | 121 | 123 | 122 | 0.50° | 0.82 | 47.84 | 51.274 | −0.7 | −0.279 | 2 | 0 | 0 | 52 | —N/a |

== RAL Effect ==
Approximate sRGB values for RAL Effect colours, grouped
| Base | −1 | | | −2 | | | −3 | | | −4 | | | −5 | | | −6 | | | −M | | |
|---|---|---|---|---|---|---|---|---|---|---|---|---|---|---|---|---|---|---|---|---|---|
| RAL 110 | 230 | 231 | 230 | 222 | 221 | 213 | 200 | 198 | 190 | 198 | 199 | 196 | 201 | 204 | 198 | 200 | 200 | 199 | 160 | 162 | 164 |
| RAL 120 | 237 | 237 | 234 | 242 | 241 | 236 | 240 | 238 | 229 | 233 | 225 | 212 | 226 | 217 | 198 | 234 | 225 | 206 | 143 | 141 | 135 |
| RAL 130 | 242 | 237 | 187 | 241 | 238 | 195 | 240 | 238 | 205 | 248 | 240 | 207 | 237 | 228 | 188 | 251 | 229 | 176 | 171 | 171 | 144 |
| RAL 140 | 250 | 211 | 169 | 254 | 218 | 166 | 254 | 227 | 193 | 253 | 223 | 190 | 248 | 228 | 200 | 229 | 210 | 182 | 176 | 158 | 126 |
| RAL 150 | 247 | 239 | 233 | 249 | 235 | 227 | 238 | 225 | 215 | 251 | 227 | 212 | 250 | 232 | 220 | 248 | 223 | 215 | 171 | 151 | 138 |
| RAL 160 | 227 | 225 | 236 | 231 | 226 | 232 | 237 | 232 | 232 | 238 | 225 | 226 | 239 | 228 | 224 | 236 | 228 | 233 | 173 | 166 | 181 |
| RAL 170 | 199 | 201 | 208 | 166 | 173 | 189 | 186 | 200 | 218 | 206 | 219 | 236 | 195 | 198 | 214 | 198 | 197 | 214 | 167 | 168 | 185 |
| RAL 180 | 174 | 188 | 198 | 185 | 205 | 221 | 199 | 219 | 235 | 201 | 225 | 236 | 199 | 221 | 225 | 219 | 233 | 235 | 150 | 164 | 169 |
| RAL 190 | 165 | 218 | 223 | 185 | 230 | 242 | 192 | 222 | 225 | 189 | 218 | 215 | 212 | 229 | 231 | 163 | 193 | 191 | 146 | 180 | 178 |
| RAL 210 | 207 | 198 | 178 | 236 | 231 | 210 | 227 | 228 | 217 | 214 | 230 | 227 | 216 | 232 | 224 | 216 | 233 | 214 | 165 | 169 | 155 |
| RAL 220 | 102 | 184 | 114 | 51 | 154 | 81 | 0 | 111 | 60 | 127 | 255 | 127 | 0 | 255 | 0 | 0 | 128 | 0 | 0 | 127 | 62 |
| RAL 230 | 187 | 219 | 154 | 150 | 200 | 108 | 125 | 179 | 68 | 95 | 151 | 58 | 57 | 105 | 56 | 54 | 92 | 48 | 98 | 167 | 78 |
| RAL 240 | 220 | 214 | 145 | 170 | 175 | 102 | 147 | 151 | 85 | 126 | 126 | 66 | 93 | 109 | 60 | 79 | 109 | 53 | 98 | 116 | 57 |
| RAL 250 | 238 | 230 | 165 | 232 | 222 | 111 | 191 | 183 | 0 | 164 | 165 | 65 | 145 | 145 | 56 | 105 | 101 | 44 | 174 | 167 | 59 |
| RAL 260 | 243 | 233 | 180 | 241 | 228 | 131 | 243 | 212 | 70 | 232 | 192 | 31 | 222 | 176 | 45 | 239 | 180 | 22 | 184 | 148 | 79 |
| RAL 270 | 255 | 222 | 131 | 250 | 204 | 57 | 244 | 189 | 22 | 235 | 177 | 0 | 246 | 182 | 0 | 254 | 196 | 63 | 203 | 148 | 55 |
| RAL 280 | 253 | 225 | 147 | 240 | 211 | 145 | 225 | 190 | 120 | 214 | 174 | 95 | 220 | 161 | 64 | 208 | 151 | 60 | 178 | 135 | 64 |
| RAL 290 | 216 | 155 | 80 | 191 | 133 | 59 | 216 | 169 | 96 | 204 | 146 | 27 | 230 | 176 | 62 | 252 | 171 | 4 | 184 | 126 | 50 |
| RAL 310 | 245 | 214 | 180 | 235 | 194 | 151 | 223 | 171 | 115 | 208 | 147 | 85 | 186 | 124 | 67 | 142 | 91 | 45 | 184 | 125 | 79 |
| RAL 320 | 210 | 169 | 108 | 174 | 129 | 81 | 185 | 134 | 76 | 160 | 103 | 53 | 127 | 78 | 46 | 110 | 68 | 40 | 185 | 115 | 30 |
| RAL 330 | 168 | 104 | 89 | 142 | 75 | 53 | 121 | 78 | 62 | 92 | 59 | 45 | 80 | 49 | 42 | 70 | 50 | 46 | 139 | 89 | 67 |
| RAL 340 | 190 | 164 | 169 | 164 | 140 | 146 | 127 | 84 | 82 | 104 | 61 | 64 | 79 | 42 | 45 | 79 | 43 | 49 | 83 | 53 | 59 |
| RAL 350 | 157 | 49 | 31 | 167 | 63 | 50 | 162 | 71 | 51 | 129 | 48 | 33 | 120 | 49 | 34 | 102 | 50 | 43 | 88 | 47 | 42 |
| RAL 360 | 224 | 125 | 41 | 217 | 117 | 30 | 198 | 98 | 23 | 183 | 86 | 41 | 154 | 79 | 44 | 145 | 80 | 51 | 164 | 86 | 51 |
| RAL 370 | 255 | 174 | 71 | 255 | 155 | 56 | 255 | 144 | 29 | 230 | 131 | 22 | 212 | 120 | 31 | 205 | 108 | 16 | 180 | 122 | 60 |
| RAL 380 | 255 | 155 | 41 | 255 | 146 | 4 | 250 | 132 | 26 | 226 | 113 | 33 | 242 | 120 | 47 | 234 | 106 | 36 | 167 | 85 | 42 |
| RAL 390 | 235 | 119 | 63 | 227 | 97 | 37 | 222 | 84 | 17 | 216 | 81 | 28 | 216 | 72 | 15 | 205 | 94 | 42 | 191 | 99 | 59 |
| RAL 410 | 237 | 129 | 101 | 234 | 115 | 79 | 228 | 100 | 64 | 220 | 93 | 56 | 210 | 85 | 53 | 208 | 93 | 66 | 171 | 73 | 36 |
| RAL 420 | 237 | 174 | 154 | 242 | 157 | 134 | 233 | 138 | 108 | 228 | 100 | 67 | 204 | 87 | 56 | 191 | 80 | 46 | 157 | 75 | 50 |
| RAL 430 | 242 | 194 | 182 | 236 | 153 | 139 | 228 | 128 | 116 | 221 | 90 | 76 | 213 | 67 | 60 | 190 | 58 | 36 | 168 | 76 | 69 |
| RAL 440 | 202 | 56 | 60 | 211 | 76 | 73 | 186 | 60 | 62 | 155 | 41 | 41 | 166 | 49 | 41 | 185 | 53 | 37 | 155 | 37 | 44 |
| RAL 450 | 244 | 199 | 202 | 237 | 165 | 170 | 224 | 122 | 129 | 200 | 88 | 98 | 178 | 49 | 47 | 187 | 32 | 29 | 167 | 22 | 22 |
| RAL 460 | 239 | 163 | 167 | 227 | 127 | 137 | 223 | 99 | 104 | 211 | 82 | 84 | 168 | 55 | 59 | 139 | 27 | 40 | 174 | 54 | 59 |
| RAL 470 | 240 | 179 | 193 | 230 | 139 | 157 | 222 | 115 | 131 | 202 | 77 | 103 | 172 | 45 | 76 | 156 | 34 | 63 | 177 | 79 | 93 |
| RAL 480 | 245 | 202 | 201 | 245 | 192 | 190 | 238 | 186 | 188 | 238 | 165 | 177 | 233 | 144 | 158 | 218 | 108 | 130 | 168 | 117 | 121 |
| RAL 490 | 243 | 207 | 208 | 247 | 202 | 195 | 232 | 154 | 146 | 195 | 123 | 119 | 190 | 127 | 140 | 210 | 158 | 168 | 167 | 125 | 136 |
| RAL 510 | 236 | 200 | 220 | 224 | 165 | 203 | 213 | 132 | 177 | 196 | 99 | 141 | 186 | 72 | 119 | 154 | 59 | 106 | 140 | 61 | 113 |
| RAL 520 | 239 | 210 | 223 | 232 | 186 | 210 | 220 | 165 | 192 | 186 | 114 | 147 | 160 | 78 | 111 | 146 | 82 | 110 | 158 | 88 | 139 |
| RAL 530 | 152 | 68 | 77 | 143 | 63 | 78 | 121 | 54 | 68 | 124 | 47 | 75 | 102 | 37 | 61 | 97 | 41 | 74 | 92 | 45 | 58 |
| RAL 540 | 212 | 193 | 215 | 190 | 161 | 193 | 128 | 95 | 131 | 150 | 107 | 152 | 129 | 83 | 122 | 86 | 44 | 81 | 86 | 47 | 78 |
| RAL 550 | 224 | 209 | 217 | 208 | 187 | 201 | 178 | 146 | 168 | 156 | 116 | 136 | 141 | 97 | 119 | 120 | 76 | 94 | 167 | 136 | 144 |
| RAL 560 | 204 | 188 | 199 | 176 | 156 | 173 | 140 | 111 | 128 | 119 | 84 | 96 | 133 | 114 | 127 | 125 | 110 | 127 | 165 | 146 | 164 |
| RAL 570 | 209 | 206 | 232 | 195 | 191 | 225 | 173 | 173 | 221 | 155 | 154 | 207 | 128 | 120 | 179 | 121 | 104 | 155 | 107 | 88 | 154 |
| RAL 580 | 194 | 207 | 230 | 188 | 199 | 224 | 167 | 178 | 209 | 105 | 116 | 154 | 65 | 80 | 110 | 36 | 49 | 84 | 99 | 108 | 134 |
| RAL 590 | 102 | 109 | 155 | 66 | 66 | 118 | 42 | 54 | 107 | 39 | 47 | 91 | 20 | 45 | 88 | 9 | 59 | 122 | 41 | 56 | 98 |
| RAL 610 | 110 | 143 | 171 | 97 | 122 | 148 | 109 | 149 | 185 | 137 | 178 | 216 | 71 | 119 | 174 | 67 | 105 | 153 | 120 | 151 | 181 |
| RAL 620 | 52 | 104 | 138 | 96 | 146 | 172 | 100 | 129 | 143 | 58 | 90 | 106 | 20 | 53 | 75 | 30 | 45 | 63 | 9 | 50 | 70 |
| RAL 630 | 81 | 163 | 211 | 68 | 107 | 142 | 46 | 78 | 111 | 45 | 74 | 110 | 31 | 52 | 84 | 25 | 54 | 84 | 22 | 48 | 76 |
| RAL 640 | 73 | 160 | 197 | 0 | 135 | 181 | 0 | 123 | 174 | 0 | 92 | 140 | 0 | 84 | 138 | 0 | 79 | 125 | 0 | 78 | 135 |
| RAL 650 | 100 | 181 | 214 | 0 | 119 | 160 | 0 | 108 | 151 | 0 | 85 | 119 | 29 | 91 | 120 | 10 | 73 | 98 | 0 | 113 | 157 |
| RAL 660 | 0 | 148 | 176 | 11 | 141 | 168 | 81 | 165 | 184 | 63 | 184 | 207 | 108 | 195 | 212 | 138 | 200 | 213 | 85 | 151 | 169 |
| RAL 670 | 138 | 211 | 234 | 151 | 218 | 239 | 143 | 197 | 214 | 105 | 187 | 211 | 91 | 185 | 213 | 78 | 194 | 230 | 116 | 167 | 184 |
| RAL 680 | 114 | 170 | 186 | 51 | 143 | 164 | 23 | 113 | 133 | 38 | 118 | 141 | 0 | 106 | 133 | 0 | 91 | 116 | 14 | 69 | 92 |
| RAL 690 | 63 | 191 | 203 | 0 | 162 | 173 | 0 | 131 | 142 | 0 | 108 | 123 | 0 | 83 | 95 | 0 | 81 | 96 | 0 | 103 | 115 |
| RAL 710 | 120 | 209 | 205 | 0 | 170 | 167 | 5 | 138 | 139 | 0 | 116 | 118 | 0 | 92 | 96 | 12 | 71 | 70 | 0 | 104 | 107 |
| RAL 720 | 194 | 227 | 222 | 164 | 226 | 219 | 134 | 211 | 212 | 88 | 190 | 193 | 51 | 147 | 160 | 25 | 124 | 134 | 26 | 148 | 154 |
| RAL 730 | 203 | 231 | 226 | 152 | 211 | 211 | 125 | 184 | 186 | 123 | 185 | 180 | 121 | 172 | 172 | 70 | 135 | 127 | 98 | 162 | 147 |
| RAL 740 | 197 | 220 | 206 | 179 | 214 | 201 | 149 | 195 | 178 | 73 | 133 | 116 | 0 | 111 | 91 | 0 | 93 | 78 | 58 | 111 | 95 |
| RAL 750 | 191 | 215 | 201 | 143 | 180 | 160 | 61 | 116 | 97 | 22 | 66 | 52 | 51 | 84 | 73 | 46 | 60 | 59 | 23 | 55 | 45 |
| RAL 760 | 213 | 227 | 202 | 184 | 205 | 170 | 176 | 190 | 155 | 139 | 155 | 122 | 109 | 126 | 92 | 74 | 100 | 72 | 51 | 75 | 46 |
| RAL 770 | 152 | 157 | 132 | 169 | 168 | 143 | 122 | 117 | 90 | 129 | 122 | 102 | 180 | 175 | 159 | 126 | 130 | 115 | 141 | 136 | 100 |
| RAL 780 | 233 | 222 | 204 | 231 | 214 | 185 | 221 | 196 | 154 | 209 | 177 | 134 | 163 | 142 | 121 | 116 | 105 | 92 | 178 | 160 | 116 |
| RAL 790 | 62 | 72 | 73 | 59 | 65 | 71 | 49 | 53 | 56 | 48 | 47 | 50 | 33 | 34 | 36 | 33 | 35 | 45 | 34 | 31 | 29 |
| RAL 810 | 151 | 157 | 162 | 138 | 148 | 153 | 121 | 136 | 142 | 94 | 107 | 115 | 81 | 89 | 93 | 57 | 65 | 70 | 64 | 70 | 73 |
| RAL 820 | 197 | 200 | 202 | 169 | 174 | 178 | 141 | 147 | 149 | 125 | 133 | 137 | 80 | 85 | 92 | 68 | 73 | 81 | 146 | 145 | 145 |
| RAL 830 | 186 | 188 | 186 | 164 | 167 | 165 | 141 | 146 | 145 | 108 | 112 | 109 | 81 | 85 | 84 | 87 | 94 | 96 | 130 | 129 | 127 |
| RAL 840 | 231 | 227 | 216 | 215 | 213 | 204 | 184 | 180 | 168 | 128 | 128 | 119 | 90 | 93 | 84 | 71 | 65 | 53 | 73 | 68 | 64 |
| RAL 850 | 195 | 194 | 185 | 177 | 177 | 170 | 166 | 166 | 160 | 145 | 141 | 133 | 107 | 103 | 96 | 76 | 75 | 70 | 98 | 94 | 89 |
| RAL 860 | 216 | 218 | 219 | 207 | 210 | 213 | 193 | 194 | 196 | 154 | 154 | 155 | 122 | 122 | 121 | 91 | 95 | 95 | 164 | 160 | 159 |
| RAL 870 | 211 | 208 | 208 | 150 | 147 | 146 | 99 | 97 | 100 | 81 | 77 | 78 | 74 | 71 | 71 | 61 | 55 | 55 | 77 | 71 | 71 |

== RAL Design System+ ==
In the RAL Design System Plus, there are groups of colours every 10° of hue and additionally at 75°, 85° and 95°. Possible lightness values are 15% through 90% in steps of 5% for monochromatic shades of grey (i.e. C = 0%) and 20% through 90% in steps of 10% and additionally 85% and 93%. Chroma values are also mostly confined to steps of 10% or 5%, but with some exceptions, and the maximum value varies.

RAL Design System+
| Name | CIELAB 1931 | | | sRGB | | | | Code |
| Name | Hue | Lightness | Chromaticity | Sample | Red | Green | Blue | Code |
|---|---|---|---|---|---|---|---|---|
| Ink Black | 0° | 15% | 0% | | 33 | 33 | 34 | H000L15C00 |
| Slate Black | 0° | 20% | 0% | | 43 | 43 | 43 | H000L20C00 |
| Onyx Black | 0° | 25% | 0% | | 58 | 58 | 58 | H000L25C00 |
| Medium Black | 0° | 30% | 0% | | 68 | 68 | 67 | H000L30C00 |
| Briquette Grey | 0° | 35% | 0% | | 80 | 80 | 80 | H000L35C00 |
| Dark Grey | 0° | 40% | 0% | | 93 | 92 | 91 | H000L40C00 |
| Architecture Grey | 0° | 45% | 0% | | 107 | 106 | 105 | H000L45C00 |
| Steel Grey | 0° | 50% | 0% | | 118 | 118 | 117 | H000L50C00 |
| Medium Grey | 0° | 55% | 0% | | 130 | 130 | 130 | H000L55C00 |
| Ash Grey | 0° | 60% | 0% | | 143 | 143 | 142 | H000L60C00 |
| Mortar Grey | 0° | 65% | 0% | | 158 | 159 | 158 | H000L65C00 |
| Light Grey | 0° | 70% | 0% | | 172 | 173 | 172 | H000L70C00 |
| Marble Grey | 0° | 75% | 0% | | 186 | 186 | 186 | H000L75C00 |
| Foggy Grey | 0° | 80% | 0% | | 201 | 200 | 199 | H000L80C00 |
| Shadow White | 0° | 85% | 0% | | 214 | 214 | 212 | H000L85C00 |
| Winter White | 0° | 90% | 0% | | 226 | 227 | 224 | H000L90C00 |
| Wenge Black | 10° | 20% | 10% | | 62 | 42 | 44 | H010L20C10 |
| Cherry Black | 10° | 20% | 15% | | 66 | 35 | 41 | H010L20C15 |
| Dark Mahogany | 10° | 20% | 20% | | 72 | 32 | 41 | H010L20C20 |
| Rusty Red | 10° | 20% | 25% | | 75 | 28 | 40 | H010L20C25 |
| Wood-Black Red | 10° | 30% | 10% | | 88 | 64 | 67 | H010L30C10 |
| Night Mauve | 10° | 30% | 15% | | 93 | 59 | 65 | H010L30C15 |
| Pinkish Brown | 10° | 30% | 20% | | 100 | 57 | 65 | H010L30C20 |
| Chestnut Red | 10° | 30% | 25% | | 108 | 51 | 63 | H010L30C25 |
| Leather Red | 10° | 30% | 30% | | 113 | 47 | 62 | H010L30C30 |
| Anthracite Red | 10° | 30% | 35% | | 115 | 41 | 59 | H010L30C35 |
| Brown Magenta | 10° | 30% | 40% | | 123 | 32 | 57 | H010L30C40 |
| Atlas Red | 10° | 30% | 44% | | 130 | 25 | 58 | H010L30C44 |
| Caput Mortuum Grey Red | 10° | 40% | 10% | | 111 | 88 | 91 | H010L40C10 |
| Rust Brown | 10° | 40% | 15% | | 119 | 83 | 89 | H010L40C15 |
| Sunset Red | 10° | 40% | 20% | | 127 | 81 | 88 | H010L40C20 |
| Mineral Red | 10° | 40% | 25% | | 134 | 77 | 88 | H010L40C25 |
| Dull Magenta | 10° | 40% | 30% | | 141 | 72 | 86 | H010L40C30 |
| Velvet Red | 10° | 40% | 35% | | 144 | 67 | 83 | H010L40C35 |
| Algae Red | 10° | 40% | 40% | | 152 | 61 | 83 | H010L40C40 |
| Raspberry Ice Red | 10° | 40% | 45% | | 159 | 55 | 83 | H010L40C45 |
| Fuchsia Red | 10° | 40% | 50% | | 165 | 49 | 82 | H010L40C50 |
| Primal Red | 10° | 40% | 53% | | 169 | 43 | 79 | H010L40C53 |
| Old Mahogany | 10° | 50% | 10% | | 136 | 113 | 117 | H010L50C10 |
| Dull Dusky Pink | 10° | 50% | 15% | | 143 | 109 | 115 | H010L50C15 |
| Brickwork Red | 10° | 50% | 20% | | 152 | 105 | 113 | H010L50C20 |
| Matte Carmine | 10° | 50% | 25% | | 160 | 101 | 112 | H010L50C25 |
| Marble Red | 10° | 50% | 30% | | 169 | 96 | 110 | H010L50C30 |
| Geranium Red | 10° | 50% | 35% | | 174 | 91 | 108 | H010L50C35 |
| Slate Pink | 10° | 50% | 40% | | 179 | 88 | 108 | H010L50C40 |
| Tulip Red | 10° | 50% | 45% | | 184 | 81 | 106 | H010L50C45 |
| Vibrant Red | 10° | 50% | 50% | | 194 | 76 | 106 | H010L50C50 |
| Lilac Grey | 10° | 60% | 10% | | 163 | 138 | 141 | H010L60C10 |
| Orchid Red | 10° | 60% | 15% | | 173 | 135 | 141 | H010L60C15 |
| Lime Pink | 10° | 60% | 20% | | 182 | 132 | 140 | H010L60C20 |
| Lipstick Pink | 10° | 60% | 25% | | 189 | 127 | 138 | H010L60C25 |
| Japanese Coral | 10° | 60% | 30% | | 196 | 122 | 136 | H010L60C30 |
| Rose Red | 10° | 60% | 35% | | 205 | 118 | 135 | H010L60C35 |
| Strawberry Milkshake Red | 10° | 60% | 40% | | 212 | 113 | 134 | H010L60C40 |
| Luminous Pink | 10° | 60% | 45% | | 220 | 108 | 132 | H010L60C45 |
| Pale Mauve | 10° | 70% | 10% | | 192 | 166 | 170 | H010L70C10 |
| Powder Rose | 10° | 70% | 15% | | 200 | 162 | 167 | H010L70C15 |
| Silver Rose | 10° | 70% | 20% | | 210 | 158 | 166 | H010L70C20 |
| Flamingo Pink | 10° | 70% | 25% | | 219 | 154 | 165 | H010L70C25 |
| Cherry Blossom Pink | 10° | 70% | 30% | | 226 | 151 | 164 | H010L70C30 |
| Baby Pink | 10° | 70% | 35% | | 234 | 145 | 161 | H010L70C35 |
| Mud Pink | 10° | 80% | 10% | | 220 | 192 | 195 | H010L80C10 |
| Ice Hot Pink | 10° | 80% | 15% | | 228 | 189 | 194 | H010L80C15 |
| Pastel Pink | 10° | 80% | 20% | | 239 | 185 | 192 | H010L80C20 |
| Pearl Rose | 10° | 85% | 5% | | 223 | 211 | 212 | H010L85C05 |
| Salmon Rose | 10° | 85% | 10% | | 230 | 207 | 210 | H010L85C10 |
| Milkshake Pink | 10° | 85% | 15% | | 240 | 205 | 210 | H010L85C15 |
| Flesh Pink | 10° | 85% | 20% | | 249 | 203 | 211 | H010L85C20 |
| Rose Cream | 10° | 90% | 5% | | 239 | 224 | 222 | H010L90C05 |
| Light Apricot | 10° | 90% | 10% | | 242 | 218 | 214 | H010L90C10 |
| White-Red | 10° | 93% | 5% | | 243 | 232 | 234 | H010L93C05 |
| Deep Brown | 20° | 20% | 5% | | 52 | 42 | 42 | H020L20C05 |
| Night Red | 20° | 20% | 10% | | 60 | 39 | 39 | H020L20C10 |
| Dark Red Brown | 20° | 20% | 20% | | 74 | 33 | 37 | H020L20C20 |
| Burgundy | 20° | 20% | 29% | | 83 | 24 | 31 | H020L20C29 |
| Rhodonite Brown | 20° | 30% | 5% | | 77 | 65 | 65 | H020L30C05 |
| Budapest Brown | 20° | 30% | 10% | | 85 | 61 | 62 | H020L30C10 |
| Kremlin Red | 20° | 30% | 20% | | 99 | 54 | 57 | H020L30C20 |
| Crystal Dark Red | 20° | 30% | 30% | | 109 | 44 | 50 | H020L30C30 |
| Amaranth Blossom | 20° | 30% | 40% | | 123 | 35 | 49 | H020L30C40 |
| Sweet Cherry Red | 20° | 30% | 48% | | 132 | 23 | 44 | H020L30C48 |
| Greyish Brown | 20° | 40% | 5% | | 103 | 91 | 91 | H020L40C05 |
| Nut Brown | 20° | 40% | 10% | | 110 | 86 | 87 | H020L40C10 |
| Antique Red | 20° | 40% | 20% | | 125 | 79 | 81 | H020L40C20 |
| Hermosa Pink | 20° | 40% | 30% | | 138 | 71 | 76 | H020L40C30 |
| October Red | 20° | 40% | 40% | | 148 | 61 | 70 | H020L40C40 |
| Bright Red | 20° | 40% | 50% | | 160 | 46 | 62 | H020L40C50 |
| Zircon Grey | 20° | 50% | 5% | | 128 | 116 | 115 | H020L50C05 |
| Sandstone Red Grey | 20° | 50% | 10% | | 136 | 110 | 112 | H020L50C10 |
| Red Grey | 20° | 50% | 20% | | 153 | 104 | 106 | H020L50C20 |
| Venetian Red | 20° | 50% | 30% | | 167 | 96 | 101 | H020L50C30 |
| Alsike Clover Red | 20° | 50% | 40% | | 177 | 87 | 95 | H020L50C40 |
| Flame Red | 20° | 50% | 50% | | 190 | 76 | 90 | H020L50C50 |
| Lingonberry Red | 20° | 50% | 58% | | 206 | 68 | 88 | H020L50C58 |
| Globe Thistle Grey Rose | 20° | 60% | 5% | | 153 | 141 | 141 | H020L60C05 |
| Tin Pink | 20° | 60% | 10% | | 163 | 137 | 138 | H020L60C10 |
| Retro Pink | 20° | 60% | 20% | | 180 | 130 | 134 | H020L60C20 |
| Begonia Rose | 20° | 60% | 30% | | 195 | 121 | 127 | H020L60C30 |
| Lotus Red | 20° | 60% | 40% | | 209 | 113 | 123 | H020L60C40 |
| Fashion Mauve | 20° | 70% | 5% | | 181 | 168 | 168 | H020L70C05 |
| Tourmaline Mauve | 20° | 70% | 10% | | 189 | 163 | 165 | H020L70C10 |
| Rosewood Apricot | 20° | 70% | 20% | | 211 | 158 | 162 | H020L70C20 |
| Marker Pink | 20° | 70% | 30% | | 227 | 150 | 155 | H020L70C30 |
| Aurora Grey | 20° | 80% | 5% | | 211 | 197 | 196 | H020L80C05 |
| Quartz Rose | 20° | 80% | 10% | | 219 | 191 | 192 | H020L80C10 |
| Marzipan Pink | 20° | 80% | 20% | | 238 | 186 | 188 | H020L80C20 |
| Almond Blossom Pink | 20° | 85% | 5% | | 224 | 210 | 209 | H020L85C05 |
| Salmon Cream | 20° | 85% | 10% | | 233 | 207 | 207 | H020L85C10 |
| Elegant Light Rose | 20° | 85% | 20% | | 253 | 202 | 202 | H020L85C20 |
| Mussel White | 20° | 90% | 5% | | 240 | 226 | 222 | H020L90C05 |
| Peach Cream | 20° | 90% | 10% | | 244 | 220 | 216 | H020L90C10 |
| Blossom White | 20° | 93% | 5% | | 248 | 232 | 228 | H020L93C05 |
| Laurel Nut Brown | 30° | 30% | 10% | | 85 | 64 | 62 | H030L30C10 |
| Autumn Leaf Red | 30° | 30% | 20% | | 98 | 56 | 54 | H030L30C20 |
| Macore Veneer Red | 30° | 30% | 30% | | 110 | 47 | 44 | H030L30C30 |
| Crimson Red | 30° | 30% | 40% | | 124 | 41 | 42 | H030L30C40 |
| Blood Red | 30° | 30% | 45% | | 125 | 30 | 32 | H030L30C45 |
| Peat Red Brown | 30° | 40% | 10% | | 108 | 87 | 85 | H030L40C10 |
| Cranberry Red | 30° | 40% | 20% | | 126 | 83 | 80 | H030L40C20 |
| Brick Brown | 30° | 40% | 30% | | 139 | 75 | 71 | H030L40C30 |
| Spicy Red | 30° | 40% | 40% | | 151 | 65 | 62 | H030L40C40 |
| Hibiscus Red | 30° | 40% | 50% | | 163 | 55 | 55 | H030L40C50 |
| Emperor Cherry Red | 30° | 40% | 60% | | 172 | 44 | 50 | H030L40C60 |
| Earth Red | 30° | 50% | 10% | | 136 | 111 | 109 | H030L50C10 |
| Terracotta Red Brown | 30° | 50% | 20% | | 151 | 106 | 102 | H030L50C20 |
| Clay Red | 30° | 50% | 30% | | 166 | 97 | 93 | H030L50C30 |
| Vermilion Red | 30° | 50% | 40% | | 180 | 90 | 86 | H030L50C40 |
| Maple Red | 30° | 50% | 50% | | 191 | 81 | 78 | H030L50C50 |
| Holland Red | 30° | 50% | 60% | | 203 | 69 | 67 | H030L50C60 |
| Storm Red | 30° | 60% | 10% | | 162 | 138 | 136 | H030L60C10 |
| Desert Red | 30° | 60% | 20% | | 179 | 131 | 127 | H030L60C20 |
| Antique Pink | 30° | 60% | 30% | | 194 | 122 | 116 | H030L60C30 |
| Light Tomato | 30° | 60% | 40% | | 208 | 117 | 111 | H030L60C40 |
| Calypso Red | 30° | 60% | 50% | | 222 | 107 | 102 | H030L60C50 |
| Florida Grey | 30° | 70% | 10% | | 190 | 164 | 162 | H030L70C10 |
| Dull Apricot | 30° | 70% | 20% | | 208 | 156 | 151 | H030L70C20 |
| Salmon Pink Red | 30° | 70% | 30% | | 225 | 149 | 143 | H030L70C30 |
| Flamingo Red | 30° | 70% | 40% | | 239 | 142 | 135 | H030L70C40 |
| Salt Pink | 30° | 80% | 10% | | 218 | 192 | 188 | H030L80C10 |
| Magnolia Pink | 30° | 80% | 20% | | 236 | 185 | 179 | H030L80C20 |
| Almond Cream | 30° | 85% | 5% | | 224 | 209 | 203 | H030L85C05 |
| Soft Ice Rose | 30° | 85% | 10% | | 231 | 207 | 202 | H030L85C10 |
| Peach Red | 30° | 85% | 20% | | 249 | 205 | 196 | H030L85C20 |
| Antique White | 30° | 90% | 5% | | 238 | 224 | 220 | H030L90C05 |
| Wedding Pink | 30° | 90% | 10% | | 246 | 223 | 216 | H030L90C10 |
| Parchment White | 30° | 93% | 5% | | 249 | 234 | 229 | H030L93C05 |
| Wild Brown | 40° | 20% | 19% | | 71 | 36 | 26 | H040L20C19 |
| Basalt Black | 40° | 30% | 5% | | 77 | 66 | 62 | H040L30C05 |
| Caviar Black | 40° | 30% | 10% | | 83 | 62 | 57 | H040L30C10 |
| Coffee Brown | 40° | 30% | 20% | | 96 | 57 | 47 | H040L30C20 |
| Root Brown | 40° | 30% | 30% | | 107 | 50 | 38 | H040L30C30 |
| Corrosion Red | 40° | 30% | 40% | | 119 | 47 | 33 | H040L30C40 |
| Ash Brown | 40° | 40% | 5% | | 103 | 91 | 88 | H040L40C05 |
| Somali Brown | 40° | 40% | 10% | | 108 | 87 | 81 | H040L40C10 |
| Vandyck Brown | 40° | 40% | 20% | | 123 | 83 | 73 | H040L40C20 |
| Chestnut Brown | 40° | 40% | 30% | | 133 | 75 | 60 | H040L40C30 |
| Brick Red | 40° | 40% | 40% | | 145 | 65 | 47 | H040L40C40 |
| Henna Red | 40° | 40% | 50% | | 157 | 61 | 39 | H040L40C50 |
| Copper Red | 40° | 40% | 60% | | 165 | 49 | 26 | H040L40C60 |
| China Red | 40° | 40% | 67% | | 173 | 43 | 16 | H040L40C67 |
| Nomad Grey | 40° | 50% | 5% | | 126 | 115 | 111 | H040L50C05 |
| Umbra Sand | 40° | 50% | 10% | | 135 | 112 | 107 | H040L50C10 |
| Agate Brown | 40° | 50% | 20% | | 149 | 106 | 96 | H040L50C20 |
| Rust Coloured | 40° | 50% | 30% | | 164 | 100 | 84 | H040L50C30 |
| Ant Red | 40° | 50% | 40% | | 176 | 93 | 74 | H040L50C40 |
| English Red | 40° | 50% | 50% | | 189 | 85 | 62 | H040L50C50 |
| Fox Red | 40° | 50% | 60% | | 202 | 78 | 51 | H040L50C60 |
| Pompeii Red | 40° | 50% | 70% | | 209 | 70 | 44 | H040L50C70 |
| Warm Grey | 40° | 60% | 5% | | 153 | 142 | 138 | H040L60C05 |
| Light Caramel | 40° | 60% | 10% | | 163 | 138 | 131 | H040L60C10 |
| Sienna Yellow | 40° | 60% | 20% | | 176 | 130 | 119 | H040L60C20 |
| Cedar Red | 40° | 60% | 30% | | 194 | 126 | 111 | H040L60C30 |
| Terra Orange | 40° | 60% | 40% | | 204 | 118 | 97 | H040L60C40 |
| Mandarin Orange | 40° | 60% | 50% | | 218 | 113 | 87 | H040L60C50 |
| Coral Orange | 40° | 60% | 60% | | 228 | 105 | 76 | H040L60C60 |
| Matte Grey | 40° | 70% | 5% | | 180 | 168 | 164 | H040L70C05 |
| Mohair Mauve | 40° | 70% | 10% | | 191 | 165 | 158 | H040L70C10 |
| Soft Sienna | 40° | 70% | 20% | | 208 | 159 | 147 | H040L70C20 |
| Industrial Rose | 40° | 70% | 30% | | 224 | 152 | 135 | H040L70C30 |
| Apricot Red | 40° | 70% | 40% | | 232 | 145 | 125 | H040L70C40 |
| Fruit Red | 40° | 70% | 50% | | 250 | 137 | 112 | H040L70C50 |
| Natural Silk Grey | 40° | 80% | 5% | | 211 | 197 | 192 | H040L80C05 |
| Thulite Rose | 40° | 80% | 10% | | 221 | 194 | 186 | H040L80C10 |
| Madder Orange | 40° | 80% | 20% | | 241 | 190 | 176 | H040L80C20 |
| Nature Apricot | 40° | 80% | 30% | | 254 | 183 | 165 | H040L80C30 |
| Pandora Grey | 40° | 85% | 5% | | 227 | 212 | 207 | H040L85C05 |
| Fine Alabaster | 40° | 85% | 10% | | 236 | 211 | 203 | H040L85C10 |
| Delicate Sweet Apricot | 40° | 85% | 20% | | 253 | 205 | 189 | H040L85C20 |
| Sahara Light Red | 40° | 90% | 5% | | 240 | 225 | 219 | H040L90C05 |
| Delicate Rose | 40° | 90% | 10% | | 247 | 224 | 214 | H040L90C10 |
| Natural White | 40° | 93% | 5% | | 251 | 237 | 229 | H040L93C05 |
| Granite Brown | 50° | 20% | 10% | | 61 | 45 | 36 | H050L20C10 |
| Night Brown | 50° | 20% | 16% | | 68 | 40 | 27 | H050L20C16 |
| Obsidian Brown | 50° | 30% | 10% | | 82 | 62 | 53 | H050L30C10 |
| Tropical Wood Brown | 50° | 30% | 20% | | 96 | 59 | 42 | H050L30C20 |
| Tobacco Brown | 50° | 30% | 30% | | 108 | 56 | 33 | H050L30C30 |
| Rosewood Brown | 50° | 30% | 36% | | 114 | 55 | 28 | H050L30C36 |
| Mocha Black | 50° | 40% | 10% | | 111 | 91 | 82 | H050L40C10 |
| Florentine Brown | 50° | 40% | 20% | | 122 | 85 | 68 | H050L40C20 |
| Curry Brown | 50° | 40% | 30% | | 132 | 80 | 56 | H050L40C30 |
| Madeira Brown | 50° | 40% | 40% | | 143 | 72 | 38 | H050L40C40 |
| Autumn Red | 50° | 40% | 50% | | 153 | 69 | 31 | H050L40C50 |
| Teakwood Brown | 50° | 50% | 10% | | 137 | 117 | 107 | H050L50C10 |
| Milk Coffee Brown | 50° | 50% | 20% | | 150 | 111 | 93 | H050L50C20 |
| Golden Brown | 50° | 50% | 30% | | 163 | 106 | 79 | H050L50C30 |
| Copper-Metal Red | 50° | 50% | 40% | | 173 | 99 | 66 | H050L50C40 |
| Gold Varnish Brown | 50° | 50% | 50% | | 185 | 94 | 51 | H050L50C50 |
| Titian Red | 50° | 50% | 60% | | 189 | 86 | 32 | H050L50C60 |
| Poppy Red | 50° | 50% | 70% | | 205 | 77 | 4 | H050L50C70 |
| Persian Orange | 50° | 50% | 78% | | 212 | 88 | 20 | H050L50C78 |
| Ecru Ochre | 50° | 60% | 10% | | 164 | 141 | 131 | H050L60C10 |
| Caramel Brown | 50° | 60% | 20% | | 177 | 135 | 117 | H050L60C20 |
| Medium Brown | 50° | 60% | 30% | | 194 | 132 | 104 | H050L60C30 |
| Apricot Brown | 50° | 60% | 40% | | 204 | 126 | 91 | H050L60C40 |
| Orange Yellow | 50° | 60% | 50% | | 216 | 121 | 76 | H050L60C50 |
| Camel Red | 50° | 60% | 60% | | 229 | 116 | 59 | H050L60C60 |
| Carrot Orange | 50° | 60% | 70% | | 233 | 103 | 45 | H050L60C70 |
| Gerbera Red | 50° | 60% | 80% | | 246 | 97 | 26 | H050L60C80 |
| Bamboo Beige | 50° | 70% | 10% | | 193 | 171 | 160 | H050L70C10 |
| Amber Grey | 50° | 70% | 20% | | 208 | 165 | 146 | H050L70C20 |
| Sienna Ochre | 50° | 70% | 30% | | 222 | 159 | 131 | H050L70C30 |
| Light Amber Orange | 50° | 70% | 40% | | 237 | 154 | 118 | H050L70C40 |
| Melon Red | 50° | 70% | 50% | | 246 | 146 | 104 | H050L70C50 |
| Mango Orange | 50° | 70% | 60% | | 255 | 139 | 88 | H050L70C60 |
| Pale Sienna | 50° | 80% | 10% | | 223 | 199 | 188 | H050L80C10 |
| Soft Orange | 50° | 80% | 20% | | 238 | 192 | 171 | H050L80C20 |
| Pallid Orange | 50° | 80% | 30% | | 252 | 185 | 157 | H050L80C30 |
| Ocean Sand | 50° | 85% | 5% | | 228 | 213 | 205 | H050L85C05 |
| Pure Beige | 50° | 85% | 10% | | 233 | 208 | 196 | H050L85C10 |
| Biscuit Cream | 50° | 85% | 20% | | 249 | 204 | 183 | H050L85C20 |
| Eggshell White | 50° | 90% | 5% | | 243 | 228 | 220 | H050L90C05 |
| Light Peach Rose | 50° | 90% | 10% | | 255 | 230 | 216 | H050L90C10 |
| Tulle White | 50° | 93% | 5% | | 251 | 237 | 229 | H050L93C05 |
| Industrial Black | 60° | 20% | 5% | | 50 | 43 | 38 | H060L20C05 |
| Vehicle Body Grey | 60° | 30% | 5% | | 76 | 67 | 61 | H060L30C05 |
| Nutria Fur Brown | 60° | 30% | 10% | | 81 | 64 | 53 | H060L30C10 |
| Peat Brown | 60° | 30% | 20% | | 90 | 61 | 41 | H060L30C20 |
| Cassiterite Brown | 60° | 30% | 27% | | 98 | 60 | 31 | H060L30C27 |
| Zinc Grey | 60° | 40% | 5% | | 101 | 91 | 85 | H060L40C05 |
| Moor Oak Grey | 60° | 40% | 10% | | 106 | 88 | 77 | H060L40C10 |
| Coffee Bean Brown | 60° | 40% | 20% | | 118 | 86 | 64 | H060L40C20 |
| Brazilian Brown | 60° | 40% | 30% | | 127 | 81 | 49 | H060L40C30 |
| Plane Brown | 60° | 40% | 40% | | 138 | 80 | 36 | H060L40C40 |
| Chinchilla Grey | 60° | 50% | 5% | | 127 | 116 | 110 | H060L50C05 |
| Sandstone Grey | 60° | 50% | 10% | | 133 | 114 | 102 | H060L50C10 |
| Mushroom Brown | 60° | 50% | 20% | | 144 | 110 | 88 | H060L50C20 |
| Mustard Brown | 60° | 50% | 30% | | 157 | 108 | 74 | H060L50C30 |
| Camel Brown | 60° | 50% | 40% | | 165 | 102 | 57 | H060L50C40 |
| Date Fruit Brown | 60° | 50% | 50% | | 175 | 100 | 43 | H060L50C50 |
| Elm Brown Red | 60° | 50% | 60% | | 178 | 91 | 9 | H060L50C60 |
| Dry Clay | 60° | 50% | 70% | | 189 | 92 | 0 | H060L50C70 |
| Screed Grey | 60° | 60% | 5% | | 154 | 144 | 138 | H060L60C05 |
| Oak Brown | 60° | 60% | 10% | | 161 | 141 | 128 | H060L60C10 |
| Light Topaz Ochre | 60° | 60% | 20% | | 176 | 137 | 113 | H060L60C20 |
| Cognac Brown | 60° | 60% | 30% | | 185 | 133 | 99 | H060L60C30 |
| Maple Syrup Brown | 60° | 60% | 40% | | 200 | 133 | 84 | H060L60C40 |
| Turmeric Red | 60° | 60% | 50% | | 202 | 122 | 64 | H060L60C50 |
| Bitter Orange | 60° | 60% | 60% | | 213 | 118 | 43 | H060L60C60 |
| Gold Orange | 60° | 60% | 70% | | 219 | 114 | 16 | H060L60C70 |
| Accent Orange | 60° | 60% | 80% | | 229 | 109 | 0 | H060L60C80 |
| Cement Greige | 60° | 70% | 5% | | 181 | 171 | 164 | H060L70C05 |
| Putty Grey | 60° | 70% | 10% | | 189 | 168 | 156 | H060L70C10 |
| Peanutbutter | 60° | 70% | 20% | | 200 | 163 | 138 | H060L70C20 |
| Peach Yellow | 60° | 70% | 30% | | 209 | 156 | 121 | H060L70C30 |
| Candle Yellow | 60° | 70% | 40% | | 224 | 155 | 110 | H060L70C40 |
| Topaz Yellow | 60° | 70% | 50% | | 235 | 151 | 94 | H060L70C50 |
| Melon Orange | 60° | 70% | 60% | | 240 | 143 | 72 | H060L70C60 |
| Indian Yellow | 60° | 70% | 70% | | 252 | 140 | 53 | H060L70C70 |
| Light Chamois Beige | 60° | 80% | 5% | | 209 | 198 | 190 | H060L80C05 |
| Soft Greige | 60° | 80% | 10% | | 215 | 195 | 181 | H060L80C10 |
| Biscuit Beige | 60° | 80% | 20% | | 230 | 191 | 166 | H060L80C20 |
| Mild Orange | 60° | 80% | 30% | | 244 | 186 | 148 | H060L80C30 |
| Apricot Orange | 60° | 80% | 40% | | 253 | 180 | 130 | H060L80C40 |
| Champagne Rose | 60° | 85% | 5% | | 227 | 214 | 204 | H060L85C05 |
| Cornmeal Beige | 60° | 85% | 10% | | 235 | 213 | 197 | H060L85C10 |
| Dough Yellow | 60° | 85% | 20% | | 246 | 208 | 182 | H060L85C20 |
| Light Saffron Orange | 60° | 85% | 30% | | 255 | 204 | 165 | H060L85C30 |
| Grain White | 60° | 90% | 5% | | 239 | 227 | 216 | H060L90C05 |
| Vanilla Cream | 60° | 90% | 10% | | 247 | 224 | 210 | H060L90C10 |
| Apricot Cream | 60° | 90% | 15% | | 253 | 220 | 200 | H060L90C15 |
| Wool White | 60° | 93% | 5% | | 249 | 237 | 228 | H060L93C05 |
| Mineral Brown | 70° | 30% | 10% | | 77 | 63 | 51 | H070L30C10 |
| Beech Brown | 70° | 30% | 20% | | 87 | 65 | 40 | H070L30C20 |
| Mink Brown | 70° | 40% | 10% | | 103 | 89 | 76 | H070L40C10 |
| Huckleberry Brown | 70° | 40% | 20% | | 113 | 86 | 59 | H070L40C20 |
| Arable Brown | 70° | 40% | 30% | | 122 | 85 | 46 | H070L40C30 |
| Autumn Gold | 70° | 40% | 40% | | 128 | 82 | 26 | H070L40C40 |
| Saruk Grey | 70° | 50% | 10% | | 129 | 114 | 101 | H070L50C10 |
| Ash Gold | 70° | 50% | 20% | | 140 | 111 | 84 | H070L50C20 |
| Lion's Mane Blonde | 70° | 50% | 30% | | 148 | 107 | 65 | H070L50C30 |
| Antique Gold | 70° | 50% | 40% | | 157 | 105 | 47 | H070L50C40 |
| Stage Gold | 70° | 50% | 50% | | 158 | 105 | 40 | H070L50C50 |
| Theatre Gold | 70° | 50% | 55% | | 167 | 105 | 36 | H070L50C55 |
| Light Mahogany | 70° | 60% | 10% | | 155 | 139 | 124 | H070L60C10 |
| Dark Blond | 70° | 60% | 20% | | 166 | 138 | 110 | H070L60C20 |
| Light Oak Brown | 70° | 60% | 30% | | 175 | 133 | 92 | H070L60C30 |
| Grain Brown | 70° | 60% | 40% | | 184 | 131 | 73 | H070L60C40 |
| Mud Yellow | 70° | 60% | 50% | | 193 | 129 | 54 | H070L60C50 |
| Mustard Yellow | 70° | 60% | 60% | | 203 | 129 | 45 | H070L60C60 |
| Seabuckthorn Yellow Brown | 70° | 60% | 70% | | 205 | 123 | 0 | H070L60C70 |
| Autumn Leaf Orange | 70° | 60% | 75% | | 208 | 122 | 4 | H070L60C75 |
| Ginger Grey Yellow | 70° | 70% | 10% | | 184 | 168 | 153 | H070L70C10 |
| Light Ash Brown | 70° | 70% | 20% | | 194 | 164 | 135 | H070L70C20 |
| Golden Beige | 70° | 70% | 30% | | 206 | 162 | 119 | H070L70C30 |
| Dechant Pear Yellow | 70° | 70% | 40% | | 215 | 158 | 98 | H070L70C40 |
| Honeycomb Yellow | 70° | 70% | 50% | | 222 | 156 | 82 | H070L70C50 |
| Gorse Yellow Orange | 70° | 70% | 60% | | 233 | 154 | 60 | H070L70C60 |
| Naples Yellow | 70° | 70% | 70% | | 235 | 147 | 31 | H070L70C70 |
| Saffron Gold | 70° | 70% | 80% | | 240 | 143 | 0 | H070L70C80 |
| Flax Beige | 70° | 80% | 10% | | 212 | 195 | 179 | H070L80C10 |
| Buttercup Yellow | 70° | 80% | 20% | | 227 | 194 | 163 | H070L80C20 |
| Golden Oat Coloured | 70° | 80% | 30% | | 236 | 190 | 145 | H070L80C30 |
| Apricot Yellow | 70° | 80% | 40% | | 247 | 189 | 129 | H070L80C40 |
| Warm Apricot | 70° | 80% | 50% | | 255 | 184 | 107 | H070L80C50 |
| Golden Rain Yellow | 70° | 80% | 60% | | 255 | 182 | 87 | H070L80C60 |
| Almond Beige | 70° | 85% | 5% | | 223 | 213 | 202 | H070L85C05 |
| Silver Thistle Beige | 70° | 85% | 10% | | 231 | 213 | 197 | H070L85C10 |
| Sandalwood Beige | 70° | 85% | 20% | | 242 | 209 | 177 | H070L85C20 |
| Hair Blonde | 70° | 85% | 30% | | 253 | 207 | 161 | H070L85C30 |
| Off White | 70° | 90% | 5% | | 237 | 228 | 217 | H070L90C05 |
| Light Corn | 70° | 90% | 10% | | 243 | 226 | 209 | H070L90C10 |
| Chalk Yellow | 70° | 90% | 20% | | 255 | 222 | 190 | H070L90C20 |
| Anemone White | 70° | 93% | 5% | | 249 | 239 | 228 | H070L93C05 |
| Tree Bark Brown | 75° | 40% | 10% | | 102 | 91 | 78 | H075L40C10 |
| Caraway Brown | 75° | 40% | 20% | | 109 | 86 | 60 | H075L40C20 |
| Bark Brown | 75° | 40% | 30% | | 115 | 83 | 42 | H075L40C30 |
| Lizard Brown | 75° | 40% | 38% | | 121 | 84 | 25 | H075L40C38 |
| Rye Dough Brown | 75° | 50% | 10% | | 128 | 115 | 101 | H075L50C10 |
| China Cinnamon | 75° | 50% | 20% | | 138 | 112 | 84 | H075L50C20 |
| Grog Yellow | 75° | 50% | 30% | | 147 | 112 | 67 | H075L50C30 |
| Amber Brown | 75° | 50% | 40% | | 154 | 108 | 49 | H075L50C40 |
| Cinnamon Brown | 75° | 50% | 50% | | 158 | 106 | 25 | H075L50C50 |
| Cumin Ochre | 75° | 50% | 58% | | 160 | 102 | 0 | H075L50C58 |
| Putty Yellow | 75° | 60% | 10% | | 157 | 142 | 127 | H075L60C10 |
| Walnut Shell Brown | 75° | 60% | 20% | | 166 | 139 | 110 | H075L60C20 |
| Clay Ochre | 75° | 60% | 30% | | 174 | 137 | 93 | H075L60C30 |
| Funchal Yellow | 75° | 60% | 40% | | 182 | 136 | 77 | H075L60C40 |
| Mango Brown | 75° | 60% | 50% | | 187 | 132 | 52 | H075L60C50 |
| Turmeric Brown | 75° | 60% | 60% | | 193 | 129 | 22 | H075L60C60 |
| Bamboo Brown | 75° | 60% | 70% | | 200 | 127 | 0 | H075L60C70 |
| Flax Fibre Grey | 75° | 70% | 10% | | 183 | 169 | 154 | H075L70C10 |
| Light Pumpkin Brown | 75° | 70% | 20% | | 194 | 165 | 133 | H075L70C20 |
| Golden Thistle Yellow | 75° | 70% | 30% | | 202 | 163 | 117 | H075L70C30 |
| Brick Yellow | 75° | 70% | 40% | | 210 | 161 | 97 | H075L70C40 |
| Deep Bamboo Yellow | 75° | 70% | 50% | | 217 | 159 | 80 | H075L70C50 |
| Intense Yellow | 75° | 70% | 60% | | 225 | 156 | 53 | H075L70C60 |
| Pumpkin Yellow | 75° | 70% | 70% | | 233 | 154 | 16 | H075L70C70 |
| Autumn Yellow | 75° | 70% | 80% | | 233 | 151 | 0 | H075L70C80 |
| Chalk Beige | 75° | 80% | 10% | | 214 | 197 | 180 | H075L80C10 |
| Light Corn Yellow | 75° | 80% | 20% | | 224 | 195 | 162 | H075L80C20 |
| Dark Yellow | 75° | 80% | 30% | | 231 | 191 | 142 | H075L80C30 |
| Ash Yellow | 75° | 80% | 40% | | 240 | 189 | 126 | H075L80C40 |
| Orient Yellow | 75° | 80% | 50% | | 247 | 185 | 105 | H075L80C50 |
| Carriage Yellow | 75° | 80% | 60% | | 255 | 183 | 86 | H075L80C60 |
| Water Lily White | 75° | 85% | 10% | | 230 | 214 | 196 | H075L85C10 |
| Banana Ice Cream | 75° | 85% | 20% | | 241 | 211 | 178 | H075L85C20 |
| Maple Beige | 75° | 85% | 30% | | 250 | 208 | 161 | H075L85C30 |
| Goldenrod Yellow | 75° | 85% | 40% | | 255 | 206 | 143 | H075L85C40 |
| Dessert Cream | 75° | 90% | 10% | | 246 | 228 | 208 | H075L90C10 |
| Butter White | 75° | 90% | 20% | | 253 | 222 | 189 | H075L90C20 |
| Vanilla White | 75° | 93% | 5% | | 246 | 238 | 229 | H075L93C05 |
| Night Brown Black | 80° | 20% | 5% | | 50 | 45 | 37 | H080L20C05 |
| Vanilla Bean Brown | 80° | 20% | 10% | | 54 | 44 | 29 | H080L20C10 |
| Earth Black | 80° | 30% | 5% | | 73 | 67 | 59 | H080L30C05 |
| Olive Black | 80° | 30% | 10% | | 75 | 64 | 49 | H080L30C10 |
| Clove Yellow Brown | 80° | 30% | 20% | | 82 | 63 | 33 | H080L30C20 |
| Smoked Oak Brown | 80° | 30% | 26% | | 87 | 63 | 22 | H080L30C26 |
| Office Grey | 80° | 40% | 5% | | 99 | 93 | 84 | H080L40C05 |
| Stone Brown | 80° | 40% | 10% | | 102 | 91 | 77 | H080L40C10 |
| Pimento Grain Brown | 80° | 40% | 20% | | 108 | 87 | 56 | H080L40C20 |
| Ochre Green | 80° | 40% | 30% | | 114 | 87 | 40 | H080L40C30 |
| Autumn Leaf Brown | 80° | 40% | 40% | | 122 | 86 | 14 | H080L40C40 |
| Dusk Grey | 80° | 50% | 5% | | 123 | 117 | 108 | H080L50C05 |
| Rye Brown | 80° | 50% | 10% | | 128 | 116 | 101 | H080L50C10 |
| Greyish Yellow | 80° | 50% | 20% | | 135 | 114 | 84 | H080L50C20 |
| Chili Green | 80° | 50% | 30% | | 141 | 112 | 64 | H080L50C30 |
| Dirt Yellow | 80° | 50% | 40% | | 146 | 110 | 46 | H080L50C40 |
| Chamois Yellow | 80° | 50% | 50% | | 152 | 110 | 25 | H080L50C50 |
| Flannel Grey | 80° | 60% | 5% | | 150 | 144 | 135 | H080L60C05 |
| Light Khaki | 80° | 60% | 10% | | 153 | 141 | 124 | H080L60C10 |
| Spelt Grain Brown | 80° | 60% | 20% | | 163 | 140 | 107 | H080L60C20 |
| Golden Quartz Ochre | 80° | 60% | 30% | | 170 | 138 | 88 | H080L60C30 |
| Bamboo Yellow | 80° | 60% | 40% | | 174 | 136 | 75 | H080L60C40 |
| Brass Yellow | 80° | 60% | 50% | | 181 | 135 | 53 | H080L60C50 |
| Fig Mustard Yellow | 80° | 60% | 60% | | 187 | 134 | 16 | H080L60C60 |
| Yellow Gold | 80° | 60% | 70% | | 190 | 132 | 0 | H080L60C70 |
| Garlic Beige | 80° | 70% | 5% | | 176 | 170 | 161 | H080L70C05 |
| Fine Greige | 80° | 70% | 10% | | 181 | 169 | 152 | H080L70C10 |
| Yellow Brown | 80° | 70% | 20% | | 191 | 167 | 133 | H080L70C20 |
| Mustard Seed Beige | 80° | 70% | 30% | | 197 | 165 | 116 | H080L70C30 |
| Diamond Yellow | 80° | 70% | 40% | | 206 | 164 | 97 | H080L70C40 |
| Antique Brass | 80° | 70% | 50% | | 212 | 162 | 78 | H080L70C50 |
| Courgette Yellow | 80° | 70% | 60% | | 218 | 161 | 53 | H080L70C60 |
| Grapefruit Yellow | 80° | 70% | 70% | | 223 | 160 | 26 | H080L70C70 |
| Sunflower Yellow | 80° | 70% | 80% | | 225 | 156 | 0 | H080L70C80 |
| Arnica Yellow | 80° | 70% | 88% | | 229 | 155 | 0 | H080L70C88 |
| Micaceous Light Grey | 80° | 80% | 5% | | 205 | 199 | 189 | H080L80C05 |
| Pastel Sand | 80° | 80% | 10% | | 213 | 198 | 180 | H080L80C10 |
| Natural Rice Beige | 80° | 80% | 20% | | 220 | 195 | 159 | H080L80C20 |
| Yellow Beige | 80° | 80% | 30% | | 227 | 192 | 141 | H080L80C30 |
| Straw Yellow | 80° | 80% | 40% | | 236 | 191 | 122 | H080L80C40 |
| Mirabelle Yellow | 80° | 80% | 50% | | 243 | 190 | 103 | H080L80C50 |
| Full Yellow | 80° | 80% | 60% | | 249 | 188 | 79 | H080L80C60 |
| Pear Yellow | 80° | 80% | 70% | | 252 | 185 | 55 | H080L80C70 |
| Fire Yellow | 80° | 80% | 80% | | 255 | 183 | 11 | H080L80C80 |
| Summer Yellow | 80° | 80% | 90% | | 255 | 183 | 0 | H080L80C90 |
| Wheat Flour White | 80° | 85% | 5% | | 221 | 214 | 202 | H080L85C05 |
| Onion White | 80° | 85% | 10% | | 226 | 213 | 194 | H080L85C10 |
| Nashi Pear Beige | 80° | 85% | 20% | | 237 | 212 | 177 | H080L85C20 |
| Vespa Yellow | 80° | 85% | 30% | | 243 | 209 | 159 | H080L85C30 |
| Puff Pastry Yellow | 80° | 85% | 40% | | 252 | 207 | 139 | H080L85C40 |
| Japanese White | 80° | 90% | 5% | | 238 | 230 | 217 | H080L90C05 |
| Mushroom White | 80° | 90% | 10% | | 240 | 225 | 205 | H080L90C10 |
| Macadamia Beige | 80° | 90% | 20% | | 247 | 223 | 186 | H080L90C20 |
| Horseradish Yellow | 80° | 90% | 30% | | 255 | 222 | 169 | H080L90C30 |
| Milk Star White | 80° | 93% | 5% | | 245 | 237 | 226 | H080L93C05 |
| Mineral Green | 85° | 40% | 10% | | 102 | 93 | 78 | H085L40C10 |
| Khaki Green | 85° | 40% | 20% | | 106 | 90 | 57 | H085L40C20 |
| Moss Brown | 85° | 40% | 30% | | 113 | 91 | 46 | H085L40C30 |
| Coriander Ochre | 85° | 50% | 10% | | 126 | 116 | 99 | H085L50C10 |
| Pyrite Slate Green | 85° | 50% | 20% | | 134 | 116 | 82 | H085L50C20 |
| Sepia Yellow | 85° | 50% | 30% | | 140 | 115 | 64 | H085L50C30 |
| Marshy Green | 85° | 50% | 40% | | 142 | 113 | 46 | H085L50C40 |
| Honey Yellow Green | 85° | 50% | 50% | | 147 | 112 | 22 | H085L50C50 |
| Matte Olive | 85° | 60% | 10% | | 153 | 143 | 127 | H085L60C10 |
| Pond Green | 85° | 60% | 20% | | 161 | 142 | 107 | H085L60C20 |
| Wood Green | 85° | 60% | 30% | | 167 | 140 | 89 | H085L60C30 |
| Lichen Green | 85° | 60% | 40% | | 172 | 139 | 70 | H085L60C40 |
| Mineral Umber | 85° | 60% | 50% | | 177 | 139 | 50 | H085L60C50 |
| Loden Yellow | 85° | 60% | 60% | | 182 | 139 | 19 | H085L60C60 |
| Raffia Greige | 85° | 70% | 10% | | 179 | 169 | 150 | H085L70C10 |
| Feldspar Grey | 85° | 70% | 20% | | 188 | 168 | 133 | H085L70C20 |
| Hay Yellow | 85° | 70% | 30% | | 194 | 167 | 112 | H085L70C30 |
| Winter Pear Beige | 85° | 70% | 40% | | 199 | 165 | 95 | H085L70C40 |
| Autumn Apple Yellow | 85° | 70% | 50% | | 205 | 164 | 73 | H085L70C50 |
| Pitmaston Pear Yellow | 85° | 70% | 60% | | 208 | 163 | 46 | H085L70C60 |
| Immortelle Yellow | 85° | 70% | 70% | | 212 | 162 | 7 | H085L70C70 |
| Golden Beryl Yellow | 85° | 70% | 75% | | 217 | 164 | 0 | H085L70C75 |
| Velvet Beige | 85° | 80% | 10% | | 208 | 197 | 177 | H085L80C10 |
| Mineral Beige | 85° | 80% | 20% | | 216 | 196 | 159 | H085L80C20 |
| Moonlight Yellow | 85° | 80% | 30% | | 225 | 195 | 139 | H085L80C30 |
| Table Pear Yellow | 85° | 80% | 40% | | 229 | 194 | 121 | H085L80C40 |
| Fruit Yellow | 85° | 80% | 50% | | 234 | 192 | 100 | H085L80C50 |
| Adonis Rose Yellow | 85° | 80% | 60% | | 239 | 191 | 77 | H085L80C60 |
| Barberry Yellow | 85° | 80% | 70% | | 243 | 189 | 50 | H085L80C70 |
| Dandelion Yellow | 85° | 80% | 80% | | 245 | 187 | 0 | H085L80C80 |
| Decor Yellow | 85° | 80% | 85% | | 246 | 187 | 0 | H085L80C85 |
| Alabaster White | 85° | 85% | 10% | | 223 | 212 | 191 | H085L85C10 |
| Light Blond | 85° | 85% | 20% | | 232 | 211 | 175 | H085L85C20 |
| Willow-Flower Yellow | 85° | 85% | 30% | | 240 | 210 | 157 | H085L85C30 |
| Light Ginger Yellow | 85° | 85% | 40% | | 247 | 210 | 140 | H085L85C40 |
| Tulip White | 85° | 90% | 10% | | 241 | 229 | 209 | H085L90C10 |
| Alpine Berry Yellow | 85° | 90% | 20% | | 247 | 224 | 186 | H085L90C20 |
| Porcelain Yellow | 85° | 90% | 30% | | 253 | 221 | 167 | H085L90C30 |
| Vintage White | 85° | 93% | 5% | | 244 | 239 | 228 | H085L93C05 |
| Limonite Brown | 90° | 30% | 10% | | 75 | 68 | 51 | H090L30C10 |
| Bark Green | 90° | 30% | 20% | | 81 | 68 | 33 | H090L30C20 |
| Boulder Brown | 90° | 40% | 10% | | 101 | 94 | 78 | H090L40C10 |
| Plum Green | 90° | 40% | 20% | | 105 | 92 | 57 | H090L40C20 |
| Vine Leaf Green | 90° | 40% | 30% | | 110 | 94 | 44 | H090L40C30 |
| Graphite Grey Green | 90° | 50% | 10% | | 124 | 118 | 102 | H090L50C10 |
| Pesto Green | 90° | 50% | 20% | | 129 | 117 | 83 | H090L50C20 |
| Giant Cactus Green | 90° | 50% | 30% | | 136 | 118 | 63 | H090L50C30 |
| Aubergine Green | 90° | 50% | 40% | | 139 | 118 | 44 | H090L50C40 |
| Oyster Grey | 90° | 60% | 10% | | 150 | 143 | 127 | H090L60C10 |
| Manzanilla Olive | 90° | 60% | 20% | | 158 | 143 | 107 | H090L60C20 |
| Camouflage Olive | 90° | 60% | 30% | | 162 | 143 | 92 | H090L60C30 |
| Laurel Green | 90° | 60% | 40% | | 165 | 141 | 69 | H090L60C40 |
| Faint Green | 90° | 60% | 50% | | 165 | 139 | 44 | H090L60C50 |
| Titanite Yellow | 90° | 60% | 60% | | 173 | 143 | 15 | H090L60C60 |
| Dusty Yellow | 90° | 70% | 10% | | 178 | 170 | 152 | H090L70C10 |
| Barbados Beige | 90° | 70% | 20% | | 184 | 169 | 131 | H090L70C20 |
| Rhubarb Leaf Green | 90° | 70% | 30% | | 188 | 168 | 114 | H090L70C30 |
| Hedgehog Cactus Yellow Green | 90° | 70% | 40% | | 196 | 170 | 94 | H090L70C40 |
| Gooseberry Yellow | 90° | 70% | 50% | | 199 | 169 | 74 | H090L70C50 |
| Bud Green | 90° | 70% | 60% | | 202 | 168 | 47 | H090L70C60 |
| Catkin Yellow | 90° | 70% | 70% | | 204 | 168 | 0 | H090L70C70 |
| Prehnite Yellow | 90° | 70% | 80% | | 208 | 167 | 0 | H090L70C80 |
| Light Beige | 90° | 80% | 10% | | 207 | 197 | 176 | H090L80C10 |
| Champagne Beige | 90° | 80% | 20% | | 212 | 196 | 158 | H090L80C20 |
| Lemon Sorbet Yellow | 90° | 80% | 30% | | 220 | 198 | 142 | H090L80C30 |
| Blossom Yellow | 90° | 80% | 40% | | 225 | 199 | 125 | H090L80C40 |
| Tasman Honey Yellow | 90° | 80% | 50% | | 230 | 197 | 98 | H090L80C50 |
| New Yellow | 90° | 80% | 60% | | 232 | 194 | 71 | H090L80C60 |
| Fashion Yellow | 90° | 80% | 70% | | 237 | 197 | 55 | H090L80C70 |
| Poster Yellow | 90° | 80% | 80% | | 236 | 193 | 0 | H090L80C80 |
| Contrasting Yellow | 90° | 80% | 90% | | 242 | 194 | 0 | H090L80C90 |
| Pepper White | 90° | 85% | 5% | | 219 | 214 | 203 | H090L85C05 |
| Paella Natural White | 90° | 85% | 10% | | 225 | 215 | 194 | H090L85C10 |
| Cider Yellow | 90° | 85% | 20% | | 231 | 214 | 175 | H090L85C20 |
| Palm Sugar Yellow | 90° | 85% | 30% | | 237 | 214 | 157 | H090L85C30 |
| March Yellow | 90° | 85% | 40% | | 241 | 212 | 138 | H090L85C40 |
| Oriole Yellow | 90° | 85% | 50% | | 246 | 213 | 118 | H090L85C50 |
| Marzipan White | 90° | 90% | 5% | | 234 | 228 | 216 | H090L90C05 |
| Primrose White | 90° | 90% | 10% | | 236 | 228 | 208 | H090L90C10 |
| Cream Yellow | 90° | 90% | 20% | | 244 | 227 | 187 | H090L90C20 |
| Wax Yellow | 90° | 90% | 30% | | 248 | 225 | 168 | H090L90C30 |
| Lemon Cream | 90° | 90% | 40% | | 254 | 225 | 147 | H090L90C40 |
| Tiger Yellow | 90° | 90% | 50% | | 255 | 222 | 126 | H090L90C50 |
| Sunrose Yellow | 90° | 90% | 60% | | 255 | 219 | 103 | H090L90C60 |
| Cream White | 90° | 93% | 5% | | 242 | 238 | 226 | H090L93C05 |
| Shady Green | 95° | 40% | 10% | | 99 | 93 | 76 | H095L40C10 |
| Forest Green | 95° | 40% | 20% | | 102 | 91 | 56 | H095L40C20 |
| Bean Green | 95° | 40% | 30% | | 104 | 92 | 39 | H095L40C30 |
| Dull Olive | 95° | 50% | 10% | | 122 | 117 | 100 | H095L50C10 |
| Cabbage Green | 95° | 50% | 20% | | 128 | 117 | 83 | H095L50C20 |
| Caper Green | 95° | 50% | 30% | | 132 | 118 | 64 | H095L50C30 |
| Garden Lettuce Green | 95° | 50% | 40% | | 135 | 118 | 43 | H095L50C40 |
| Artichoke Green | 95° | 50% | 50% | | 137 | 119 | 20 | H095L50C50 |
| Pale Green Grey | 95° | 60% | 10% | | 150 | 144 | 126 | H095L60C10 |
| Pale Green | 95° | 60% | 20% | | 154 | 143 | 108 | H095L60C20 |
| Cypress Green | 95° | 60% | 30% | | 158 | 143 | 87 | H095L60C30 |
| Grape Green | 95° | 60% | 40% | | 161 | 143 | 68 | H095L60C40 |
| Gooseberry Green | 95° | 60% | 50% | | 163 | 145 | 47 | H095L60C50 |
| Guava Green | 95° | 60% | 60% | | 161 | 141 | 13 | H095L60C60 |
| Romaine Green | 95° | 60% | 70% | | 163 | 142 | 0 | H095L60C70 |
| Sand Grey | 95° | 70% | 10% | | 178 | 171 | 152 | H095L70C10 |
| Crocodile Green | 95° | 70% | 20% | | 183 | 172 | 135 | H095L70C20 |
| Chicory Green | 95° | 70% | 30% | | 187 | 171 | 117 | H095L70C30 |
| Banana Green | 95° | 70% | 40% | | 189 | 170 | 93 | H095L70C40 |
| Star Fruit Yellow Green | 95° | 70% | 50% | | 190 | 170 | 74 | H095L70C50 |
| Papaya Yellow Green | 95° | 70% | 60% | | 190 | 169 | 50 | H095L70C60 |
| Bronze Green | 95° | 70% | 70% | | 195 | 170 | 0 | H095L70C70 |
| Sapphire Light Yellow | 95° | 80% | 10% | | 205 | 199 | 180 | H095L80C10 |
| Pale Olive | 95° | 80% | 20% | | 211 | 199 | 161 | H095L80C20 |
| Asparagus Yellow | 95° | 80% | 30% | | 218 | 201 | 142 | H095L80C30 |
| Pea Green | 95° | 80% | 40% | | 221 | 200 | 122 | H095L80C40 |
| Williams Pear Yellow | 95° | 80% | 50% | | 221 | 199 | 101 | H095L80C50 |
| Greenish Yellow | 95° | 80% | 60% | | 219 | 196 | 77 | H095L80C60 |
| Mimosa Yellow | 95° | 80% | 70% | | 223 | 198 | 51 | H095L80C70 |
| Sorbet Yellow | 95° | 80% | 80% | | 218 | 193 | 0 | H095L80C80 |
| Salsify White | 95° | 85% | 10% | | 222 | 216 | 196 | H095L85C10 |
| Dull Light Yellow | 95° | 85% | 20% | | 229 | 217 | 180 | H095L85C20 |
| Leaf Yellow | 95° | 85% | 30% | | 233 | 215 | 158 | H095L85C30 |
| Natural Yellow | 95° | 85% | 40% | | 238 | 216 | 139 | H095L85C40 |
| Sport Yellow | 95° | 85% | 50% | | 239 | 214 | 120 | H095L85C50 |
| Atlas White | 95° | 90% | 10% | | 236 | 228 | 206 | H095L90C10 |
| Pearl Yellow | 95° | 90% | 20% | | 241 | 227 | 188 | H095L90C20 |
| Lemon Ice Yellow | 95° | 90% | 30% | | 246 | 226 | 167 | H095L90C30 |
| Fresh Yellow | 95° | 90% | 40% | | 247 | 225 | 144 | H095L90C40 |
| Luminous Yellow | 95° | 90% | 50% | | 254 | 227 | 127 | H095L90C50 |
| Dynamic Yellow | 95° | 90% | 59% | | 255 | 227 | 109 | H095L90C59 |
| Crepe Silk White | 95° | 93% | 5% | | 240 | 238 | 227 | H095L93C05 |
| Night Green | 100° | 20% | 5% | | 48 | 47 | 39 | H100L20C05 |
| Volcanic Stone Green | 100° | 30% | 5% | | 69 | 67 | 59 | H100L30C05 |
| Vermilion Green | 100° | 30% | 10% | | 71 | 66 | 48 | H100L30C10 |
| Uniform Green | 100° | 30% | 20% | | 76 | 70 | 35 | H100L30C20 |
| Dove Grey | 100° | 40% | 5% | | 93 | 91 | 83 | H100L40C05 |
| Slick Green | 100° | 40% | 10% | | 97 | 93 | 76 | H100L40C10 |
| Broccoli Green | 100° | 40% | 20% | | 99 | 93 | 59 | H100L40C20 |
| High Forest Green | 100° | 40% | 30% | | 102 | 93 | 37 | H100L40C30 |
| Brussels Sprout Green | 100° | 40% | 40% | | 102 | 94 | 13 | H100L40C40 |
| Forest Floor Khaki | 100° | 50% | 5% | | 120 | 118 | 109 | H100L50C05 |
| Lapwing Grey Green | 100° | 50% | 10% | | 122 | 117 | 98 | H100L50C10 |
| Green Woodpecker Olive | 100° | 50% | 20% | | 125 | 120 | 83 | H100L50C20 |
| Steppe Green | 100° | 50% | 30% | | 125 | 118 | 64 | H100L50C30 |
| Faience Green | 100° | 50% | 40% | | 129 | 118 | 43 | H100L50C40 |
| Tool Green | 100° | 50% | 50% | | 127 | 119 | 17 | H100L50C50 |
| Smoky Grey Green | 100° | 60% | 5% | | 147 | 144 | 135 | H100L60C05 |
| Olivine Grey | 100° | 60% | 10% | | 146 | 142 | 124 | H100L60C10 |
| Grey-Headed Woodpecker Green | 100° | 60% | 20% | | 152 | 145 | 108 | H100L60C20 |
| Cardamom Green | 100° | 60% | 30% | | 152 | 144 | 87 | H100L60C30 |
| Lettuce Green | 100° | 60% | 40% | | 155 | 146 | 70 | H100L60C40 |
| Art Nouveau Green | 100° | 60% | 50% | | 156 | 147 | 47 | H100L60C50 |
| Smoothie Green | 100° | 60% | 60% | | 152 | 142 | 1 | H100L60C60 |
| Smoky White | 100° | 70% | 5% | | 174 | 173 | 163 | H100L70C05 |
| Anise Grey Yellow | 100° | 70% | 10% | | 176 | 172 | 152 | H100L70C10 |
| Sand Brown | 100° | 70% | 20% | | 179 | 172 | 133 | H100L70C20 |
| Hippie Green | 100° | 70% | 30% | | 180 | 172 | 113 | H100L70C30 |
| Linden Green | 100° | 70% | 40% | | 184 | 174 | 96 | H100L70C40 |
| Dill Green | 100° | 70% | 50% | | 182 | 172 | 75 | H100L70C50 |
| New Green | 100° | 70% | 60% | | 181 | 172 | 49 | H100L70C60 |
| Natural Grey | 100° | 80% | 5% | | 200 | 199 | 188 | H100L80C05 |
| Pale Beige | 100° | 80% | 10% | | 204 | 199 | 177 | H100L80C10 |
| Soft Green | 100° | 80% | 20% | | 210 | 202 | 161 | H100L80C20 |
| Silver Green | 100° | 80% | 30% | | 210 | 200 | 140 | H100L80C30 |
| March Tulip Green | 100° | 80% | 40% | | 212 | 201 | 120 | H100L80C40 |
| Light Olive | 100° | 80% | 50% | | 212 | 201 | 100 | H100L80C50 |
| Advertisement Green | 100° | 80% | 60% | | 216 | 203 | 75 | H100L80C60 |
| LED Green | 100° | 80% | 70% | | 216 | 203 | 50 | H100L80C70 |
| March Green | 100° | 80% | 80% | | 212 | 204 | 0 | H100L80C80 |
| Celery White | 100° | 85% | 5% | | 219 | 217 | 205 | H100L85C05 |
| Palm Heart Cream | 100° | 85% | 10% | | 221 | 216 | 194 | H100L85C10 |
| Beige Green | 100° | 85% | 20% | | 224 | 216 | 176 | H100L85C20 |
| Crystal Yellow | 100° | 85% | 30% | | 228 | 217 | 159 | H100L85C30 |
| Brilliant Yellow | 100° | 90% | 5% | | 232 | 229 | 216 | H100L90C05 |
| Elderberry White | 100° | 90% | 10% | | 234 | 229 | 207 | H100L90C10 |
| Designer Cream Yellow | 100° | 90% | 20% | | 239 | 229 | 187 | H100L90C20 |
| Boxwood Yellow | 100° | 90% | 30% | | 239 | 228 | 165 | H100L90C30 |
| Primrose Yellow | 100° | 90% | 40% | | 243 | 230 | 146 | H100L90C40 |
| Spring Yellow | 100° | 90% | 50% | | 242 | 228 | 125 | H100L90C50 |
| Fog White | 100° | 93% | 5% | | 241 | 239 | 228 | H100L93C05 |
| Metal Construction Green | 110° | 20% | 10% | | 47 | 46 | 31 | H110L20C10 |
| Dark Olive Green | 110° | 30% | 10% | | 69 | 70 | 54 | H110L30C10 |
| Nori Seaweed Green | 110° | 30% | 20% | | 70 | 72 | 38 | H110L30C20 |
| Stump Green | 110° | 40% | 10% | | 94 | 95 | 77 | H110L40C10 |
| Antique Green | 110° | 40% | 20% | | 92 | 93 | 57 | H110L40C20 |
| Gardener Green | 110° | 40% | 30% | | 94 | 96 | 42 | H110L40C30 |
| Kirchner Green | 110° | 40% | 40% | | 92 | 97 | 22 | H110L40C40 |
| November Green | 110° | 50% | 10% | | 118 | 119 | 100 | H110L50C10 |
| Alexandrite Green | 110° | 50% | 20% | | 118 | 120 | 83 | H110L50C20 |
| Plant Green | 110° | 50% | 30% | | 119 | 122 | 68 | H110L50C30 |
| Ripe Green | 110° | 50% | 40% | | 116 | 122 | 44 | H110L50C40 |
| Portuguese Green | 110° | 50% | 50% | | 113 | 121 | 16 | H110L50C50 |
| Flag Green | 110° | 50% | 55% | | 113 | 124 | 0 | H110L50C55 |
| Grey Green | 110° | 60% | 10% | | 144 | 145 | 126 | H110L60C10 |
| Peapod Green | 110° | 60% | 20% | | 142 | 145 | 109 | H110L60C20 |
| Indian Green | 110° | 60% | 30% | | 145 | 149 | 95 | H110L60C30 |
| Winterpea Green | 110° | 60% | 40% | | 142 | 149 | 73 | H110L60C40 |
| Airline Green | 110° | 60% | 50% | | 140 | 150 | 50 | H110L60C50 |
| Woodruff Green | 110° | 60% | 60% | | 139 | 153 | 22 | H110L60C60 |
| Traffic Light Green | 110° | 60% | 65% | | 140 | 153 | 0 | H110L60C65 |
| Chinese Tea Green | 110° | 70% | 10% | | 172 | 173 | 152 | H110L70C10 |
| Wall Green | 110° | 70% | 20% | | 171 | 174 | 134 | H110L70C20 |
| Wasabi Green | 110° | 70% | 30% | | 169 | 173 | 116 | H110L70C30 |
| April Green | 110° | 70% | 40% | | 169 | 176 | 98 | H110L70C40 |
| Delaunay Green | 110° | 70% | 50% | | 170 | 179 | 80 | H110L70C50 |
| Lime Green | 110° | 70% | 60% | | 166 | 178 | 55 | H110L70C60 |
| Chlorophyll Green | 110° | 70% | 70% | | 158 | 177 | 0 | H110L70C70 |
| Marker Green | 110° | 70% | 77% | | 157 | 175 | 0 | H110L70C77 |
| Spring Grey | 110° | 80% | 10% | | 197 | 198 | 179 | H110L80C10 |
| Mint Ice Green | 110° | 80% | 20% | | 201 | 202 | 161 | H110L80C20 |
| Springtide Green | 110° | 80% | 30% | | 200 | 203 | 142 | H110L80C30 |
| Lime Sorbet Green | 110° | 80% | 40% | | 198 | 205 | 125 | H110L80C40 |
| Easter Green | 110° | 80% | 50% | | 199 | 207 | 104 | H110L80C50 |
| Clown Green | 110° | 80% | 60% | | 196 | 208 | 86 | H110L80C60 |
| Juice Green | 110° | 80% | 70% | | 192 | 208 | 54 | H110L80C70 |
| Veltliner White | 110° | 85% | 10% | | 215 | 216 | 195 | H110L85C10 |
| Kohlrabi Green | 110° | 85% | 20% | | 217 | 217 | 177 | H110L85C20 |
| Burgundy Grey | 110° | 85% | 30% | | 218 | 219 | 160 | H110L85C30 |
| Wax Green | 110° | 85% | 40% | | 216 | 219 | 139 | H110L85C40 |
| Sprout Green | 110° | 85% | 50% | | 214 | 219 | 118 | H110L85C50 |
| Cotton White | 110° | 90% | 5% | | 228 | 227 | 216 | H110L90C05 |
| Light Fern Green | 110° | 90% | 10% | | 230 | 230 | 208 | H110L90C10 |
| Lily Scent Green | 110° | 90% | 20% | | 230 | 230 | 188 | H110L90C20 |
| Kiwi Ice Cream Green | 110° | 90% | 30% | | 229 | 231 | 167 | H110L90C30 |
| Lime Juice Green | 110° | 90% | 40% | | 229 | 232 | 150 | H110L90C40 |
| Raffia White | 110° | 93% | 5% | | 238 | 238 | 227 | H110L93C05 |
| Laundry White | 110° | 96% | 2% | | 246 | 247 | 241 | H110L96C02 |
| Racing Green | 120° | 30% | 5% | | 65 | 67 | 58 | H120L30C05 |
| Country House Green | 120° | 30% | 10% | | 65 | 70 | 52 | H120L30C10 |
| Avocado Dark Green | 120° | 30% | 20% | | 62 | 72 | 38 | H120L30C20 |
| English Green | 120° | 40% | 5% | | 90 | 92 | 83 | H120L40C05 |
| Almond Green | 120° | 40% | 10% | | 89 | 94 | 76 | H120L40C10 |
| Cactus Green | 120° | 40% | 20% | | 86 | 96 | 61 | H120L40C20 |
| Basil Green | 120° | 40% | 30% | | 84 | 98 | 46 | H120L40C30 |
| Pepper Green | 120° | 40% | 40% | | 78 | 99 | 20 | H120L40C40 |
| Smoke Green | 120° | 50% | 5% | | 117 | 118 | 108 | H120L50C05 |
| Velvet Green Grey | 120° | 50% | 10% | | 115 | 120 | 102 | H120L50C10 |
| Parrot Green | 120° | 50% | 20% | | 113 | 123 | 86 | H120L50C20 |
| Quartz Green | 120° | 50% | 30% | | 110 | 124 | 69 | H120L50C30 |
| Hedge Green | 120° | 50% | 40% | | 105 | 125 | 54 | H120L50C40 |
| Birch Leaf Green | 120° | 50% | 50% | | 99 | 126 | 29 | H120L50C50 |
| Bluish Grey | 120° | 60% | 5% | | 146 | 148 | 137 | H120L60C05 |
| Lavender Leaf Green | 120° | 60% | 10% | | 140 | 145 | 128 | H120L60C10 |
| Cider Pear Green | 120° | 60% | 20% | | 138 | 148 | 111 | H120L60C20 |
| Vesuvian Green | 120° | 60% | 30% | | 135 | 152 | 96 | H120L60C30 |
| Bamboo Grass Green | 120° | 60% | 40% | | 130 | 153 | 76 | H120L60C40 |
| Aloe Vera Green | 120° | 60% | 50% | | 126 | 155 | 57 | H120L60C50 |
| Mamba Green | 120° | 60% | 60% | | 119 | 154 | 32 | H120L60C60 |
| Luminescent Green | 120° | 60% | 63% | | 118 | 156 | 24 | H120L60C63 |
| Laurel Grey | 120° | 70% | 5% | | 170 | 172 | 162 | H120L70C05 |
| Nile Green | 120° | 70% | 10% | | 169 | 173 | 153 | H120L70C10 |
| Filigree Green | 120° | 70% | 20% | | 165 | 175 | 137 | H120L70C20 |
| Serpentine Green | 120° | 70% | 30% | | 162 | 179 | 122 | H120L70C30 |
| Light Birch Green | 120° | 70% | 40% | | 157 | 181 | 103 | H120L70C40 |
| Clematis Green | 120° | 70% | 50% | | 152 | 182 | 82 | H120L70C50 |
| Tourmaline Green | 120° | 70% | 60% | | 145 | 179 | 60 | H120L70C60 |
| Cocktail Green | 120° | 70% | 70% | | 142 | 184 | 38 | H120L70C70 |
| Brilliant Green | 120° | 70% | 75% | | 136 | 180 | 7 | H120L70C75 |
| Dust Green | 120° | 80% | 5% | | 198 | 200 | 190 | H120L80C05 |
| Jugendstil Green | 120° | 80% | 10% | | 195 | 200 | 179 | H120L80C10 |
| Avocado Cream | 120° | 80% | 20% | | 194 | 205 | 165 | H120L80C20 |
| Natural Green | 120° | 80% | 30% | | 188 | 205 | 145 | H120L80C30 |
| Summer Green | 120° | 80% | 40% | | 185 | 208 | 128 | H120L80C40 |
| Fashion Green | 120° | 80% | 50% | | 179 | 210 | 109 | H120L80C50 |
| Neon Green | 120° | 80% | 60% | | 176 | 212 | 93 | H120L80C60 |
| Chalk Green | 120° | 85% | 5% | | 214 | 216 | 205 | H120L85C05 |
| Light Feather Green | 120° | 85% | 10% | | 211 | 217 | 197 | H120L85C10 |
| Lake Green | 120° | 85% | 20% | | 210 | 219 | 180 | H120L85C20 |
| Aqua Green | 120° | 85% | 30% | | 206 | 220 | 160 | H120L85C30 |
| Lily of the Valley White | 120° | 90% | 5% | | 225 | 227 | 215 | H120L90C05 |
| Pale Pistachio | 120° | 90% | 10% | | 227 | 231 | 209 | H120L90C10 |
| Kiwi Sorbet Green | 120° | 90% | 20% | | 222 | 232 | 190 | H120L90C20 |
| Ice Cold Green | 120° | 90% | 30% | | 217 | 235 | 172 | H120L90C30 |
| Touch Of White Green | 120° | 93% | 5% | | 236 | 239 | 227 | H120L93C05 |
| Arame Seaweed Green | 130° | 30% | 10% | | 63 | 70 | 53 | H130L30C10 |
| Kelp Green | 130° | 30% | 20% | | 57 | 72 | 39 | H130L30C20 |
| Soft Olive | 130° | 40% | 10% | | 89 | 96 | 79 | H130L40C10 |
| Alpine Lake Green | 130° | 40% | 20% | | 79 | 96 | 62 | H130L40C20 |
| Gemstone Green | 130° | 40% | 30% | | 75 | 99 | 49 | H130L40C30 |
| Dubuffet Green | 130° | 50% | 10% | | 111 | 119 | 102 | H130L50C10 |
| Spanish Green | 130° | 50% | 20% | | 106 | 123 | 89 | H130L50C20 |
| Algae Green | 130° | 50% | 30% | | 97 | 125 | 72 | H130L50C30 |
| Hot Pepper Green | 130° | 50% | 40% | | 89 | 128 | 57 | H130L50C40 |
| Emerald Clear Green | 130° | 50% | 50% | | 79 | 129 | 41 | H130L50C50 |
| Matte Sage Green | 130° | 60% | 10% | | 138 | 147 | 129 | H130L60C10 |
| Old Green | 130° | 60% | 20% | | 131 | 149 | 115 | H130L60C20 |
| Pea Aubergine Green | 130° | 60% | 30% | | 124 | 152 | 101 | H130L60C30 |
| Bavarian Green | 130° | 60% | 40% | | 116 | 154 | 84 | H130L60C40 |
| Parisian Green | 130° | 60% | 50% | | 107 | 156 | 66 | H130L60C50 |
| Primal Green | 130° | 60% | 60% | | 96 | 158 | 47 | H130L60C60 |
| Limestone Green | 130° | 70% | 10% | | 165 | 175 | 157 | H130L70C10 |
| Soap Green | 130° | 70% | 20% | | 160 | 178 | 142 | H130L70C20 |
| Watercolour Green | 130° | 70% | 30% | | 150 | 180 | 126 | H130L70C30 |
| Van Gogh Green | 130° | 70% | 40% | | 143 | 182 | 109 | H130L70C40 |
| Apple Green | 130° | 70% | 50% | | 135 | 185 | 96 | H130L70C50 |
| Ultra Green | 130° | 70% | 60% | | 126 | 186 | 77 | H130L70C60 |
| Jade Light Green | 130° | 80% | 10% | | 193 | 202 | 183 | H130L80C10 |
| Enamel Green | 130° | 80% | 20% | | 186 | 204 | 168 | H130L80C20 |
| Pastel Green | 130° | 80% | 30% | | 179 | 207 | 153 | H130L80C30 |
| Jasmine Green | 130° | 80% | 40% | | 172 | 211 | 139 | H130L80C40 |
| Crystal Green | 130° | 80% | 50% | | 164 | 213 | 121 | H130L80C50 |
| Grape Oil Green | 130° | 85% | 5% | | 211 | 217 | 206 | H130L85C05 |
| Duchamp Light Green | 130° | 85% | 10% | | 209 | 219 | 199 | H130L85C10 |
| Pallid Light Green | 130° | 85% | 20% | | 203 | 220 | 183 | H130L85C20 |
| Viridine Green | 130° | 85% | 30% | | 200 | 224 | 171 | H130L85C30 |
| Poplar White | 130° | 90% | 5% | | 223 | 227 | 216 | H130L90C05 |
| Mediterranean Green | 130° | 90% | 10% | | 224 | 233 | 211 | H130L90C10 |
| Spring Green | 130° | 90% | 20% | | 214 | 233 | 195 | H130L90C20 |
| Bean White | 130° | 93% | 5% | | 235 | 240 | 228 | H130L93C05 |
| Melanite Black Green | 140° | 20% | 5% | | 40 | 46 | 39 | H140L20C05 |
| Mountain Range Green | 140° | 20% | 10% | | 40 | 49 | 35 | H140L20C10 |
| Bavarian Green | 140° | 20% | 20% | | 37 | 54 | 30 | H140L20C20 |
| Black Forest Green | 140° | 30% | 5% | | 66 | 71 | 64 | H140L30C05 |
| Copper Pyrite Green | 140° | 30% | 10% | | 62 | 73 | 57 | H140L30C10 |
| Nettle Green | 140° | 30% | 20% | | 54 | 76 | 46 | H140L30C20 |
| Chestnut Green | 140° | 30% | 30% | | 42 | 79 | 33 | H140L30C30 |
| Ranger Green | 140° | 30% | 40% | | 27 | 79 | 28 | H140L30C40 |
| Stone Green | 140° | 40% | 5% | | 89 | 95 | 87 | H140L40C05 |
| Loden Green | 140° | 40% | 10% | | 85 | 97 | 81 | H140L40C10 |
| Acacia Green | 140° | 40% | 20% | | 72 | 98 | 65 | H140L40C20 |
| Peacock Green | 140° | 40% | 30% | | 64 | 102 | 53 | H140L40C30 |
| Radical Green | 140° | 40% | 40% | | 50 | 106 | 43 | H140L40C40 |
| Brazilian Green | 140° | 40% | 50% | | 41 | 109 | 35 | H140L40C50 |
| Silver Maple Green | 140° | 50% | 5% | | 113 | 119 | 110 | H140L50C05 |
| Fir Spruce Green | 140° | 50% | 10% | | 109 | 121 | 105 | H140L50C10 |
| Silver Willow Green | 140° | 50% | 20% | | 99 | 124 | 91 | H140L50C20 |
| Rambling Green | 140° | 50% | 30% | | 90 | 128 | 79 | H140L50C30 |
| Guinean Green | 140° | 50% | 40% | | 74 | 129 | 64 | H140L50C40 |
| Mountain Meadow Green | 140° | 50% | 50% | | 65 | 134 | 56 | H140L50C50 |
| Temperamental Green | 140° | 50% | 60% | | 43 | 135 | 37 | H140L50C60 |
| Camouflage Green | 140° | 60% | 5% | | 139 | 145 | 138 | H140L60C05 |
| Silver Linden Grey | 140° | 60% | 10% | | 133 | 147 | 130 | H140L60C10 |
| Spinach Green | 140° | 60% | 20% | | 126 | 153 | 119 | H140L60C20 |
| Blackthorn Green | 140° | 60% | 30% | | 115 | 156 | 105 | H140L60C30 |
| Fresh Green | 140° | 60% | 40% | | 106 | 158 | 92 | H140L60C40 |
| Parsley Green | 140° | 60% | 50% | | 90 | 159 | 77 | H140L60C50 |
| Oregano Green | 140° | 60% | 60% | | 77 | 162 | 65 | H140L60C60 |
| Balloon Green | 140° | 60% | 70% | | 59 | 162 | 52 | H140L60C70 |
| Ginkgo Green | 140° | 70% | 5% | | 165 | 172 | 164 | H140L70C05 |
| Wormwood Green | 140° | 70% | 10% | | 159 | 174 | 158 | H140L70C10 |
| Dew Green | 140° | 70% | 20% | | 151 | 179 | 145 | H140L70C20 |
| Aniseed Leaf Green | 140° | 70% | 30% | | 140 | 182 | 132 | H140L70C30 |
| Sour Green | 140° | 70% | 40% | | 132 | 185 | 119 | H140L70C40 |
| Acid Green | 140° | 70% | 50% | | 118 | 187 | 104 | H140L70C50 |
| Drop Green | 140° | 70% | 60% | | 105 | 189 | 90 | H140L70C60 |
| Willow Green | 140° | 80% | 5% | | 195 | 202 | 191 | H140L80C05 |
| Pastel Grey Green | 140° | 80% | 10% | | 188 | 203 | 185 | H140L80C10 |
| Gio Ponti Green | 140° | 80% | 20% | | 179 | 206 | 171 | H140L80C20 |
| Relaxation Green | 140° | 80% | 30% | | 168 | 209 | 158 | H140L80C30 |
| Dentist Green | 140° | 80% | 40% | | 153 | 213 | 144 | H140L80C40 |
| Deadnettle White | 140° | 85% | 5% | | 210 | 218 | 208 | H140L85C05 |
| Leek White | 140° | 85% | 10% | | 206 | 220 | 202 | H140L85C10 |
| Limestone Slate | 140° | 85% | 20% | | 197 | 224 | 189 | H140L85C20 |
| Mint Cocktail Green | 140° | 85% | 30% | | 184 | 226 | 176 | H140L85C30 |
| Rosemary White | 140° | 90% | 5% | | 223 | 230 | 218 | H140L90C05 |
| Touch Of Green | 140° | 90% | 10% | | 219 | 233 | 213 | H140L90C10 |
| Chestnut White | 140° | 93% | 5% | | 234 | 241 | 230 | H140L93C05 |
| Thyme Green | 150° | 30% | 10% | | 61 | 75 | 61 | H150L30C10 |
| Moselle Green | 150° | 30% | 20% | | 46 | 78 | 54 | H150L30C20 |
| Mountain Green | 150° | 30% | 30% | | 30 | 79 | 43 | H150L30C30 |
| Felt Green | 150° | 40% | 10% | | 82 | 97 | 83 | H150L40C10 |
| Firm Green | 150° | 40% | 20% | | 71 | 101 | 74 | H150L40C20 |
| Genever Green | 150° | 40% | 30% | | 51 | 103 | 63 | H150L40C30 |
| Ink Green | 150° | 40% | 40% | | 28 | 106 | 53 | H150L40C40 |
| Ireland Green | 150° | 40% | 50% | | 0 | 108 | 46 | H150L40C50 |
| Sage Green Grey | 150° | 50% | 10% | | 105 | 121 | 106 | H150L50C10 |
| Korean Mint | 150° | 50% | 20% | | 93 | 125 | 97 | H150L50C20 |
| Field Green | 150° | 50% | 30% | | 83 | 128 | 89 | H150L50C30 |
| Celery Green | 150° | 50% | 40% | | 63 | 134 | 83 | H150L50C40 |
| Rich Green | 150° | 50% | 50% | | 33 | 136 | 69 | H150L50C50 |
| Cold Green | 150° | 50% | 60% | | 0 | 139 | 60 | H150L50C60 |
| Pointed Cabbage Green | 150° | 60% | 10% | | 133 | 149 | 135 | H150L60C10 |
| Orient Green | 150° | 60% | 20% | | 119 | 153 | 125 | H150L60C20 |
| Rosemary Green | 150° | 60% | 30% | | 105 | 155 | 114 | H150L60C30 |
| Mosaic Green | 150° | 60% | 40% | | 89 | 159 | 104 | H150L60C40 |
| Bouncy Ball Green | 150° | 60% | 50% | | 73 | 164 | 98 | H150L60C50 |
| Energy Green | 150° | 60% | 60% | | 28 | 163 | 80 | H150L60C60 |
| Tea Green | 150° | 70% | 10% | | 158 | 175 | 160 | H150L70C10 |
| Liebermann Green | 150° | 70% | 20% | | 146 | 180 | 152 | H150L70C20 |
| Oilcloth Green | 150° | 70% | 30% | | 131 | 186 | 142 | H150L70C30 |
| Jade Stone Green | 150° | 70% | 40% | | 116 | 187 | 131 | H150L70C40 |
| Verdigris Coloured | 150° | 70% | 50% | | 98 | 190 | 119 | H150L70C50 |
| Organza Green | 150° | 80% | 10% | | 187 | 204 | 189 | H150L80C10 |
| Pastel Mint Green | 150° | 80% | 20% | | 173 | 208 | 179 | H150L80C20 |
| Bright Green | 150° | 80% | 30% | | 159 | 212 | 170 | H150L80C30 |
| Mother-Of-Pearl Green | 150° | 80% | 40% | | 143 | 216 | 159 | H150L80C40 |
| Asparagus White | 150° | 85% | 5% | | 206 | 217 | 207 | H150L85C05 |
| Transparent White | 150° | 85% | 10% | | 203 | 220 | 203 | H150L85C10 |
| Pallid Green | 150° | 85% | 20% | | 193 | 224 | 193 | H150L85C20 |
| Mineral White | 150° | 90% | 5% | | 220 | 229 | 217 | H150L90C05 |
| Alabaster Green | 150° | 90% | 10% | | 215 | 233 | 215 | H150L90C10 |
| Quark White | 150° | 93% | 5% | | 231 | 241 | 230 | H150L93C05 |
| Beryl Black Green | 160° | 20% | 5% | | 43 | 50 | 45 | H160L20C05 |
| Mussel Green | 160° | 20% | 10% | | 36 | 52 | 42 | H160L20C10 |
| Pumpkin Green Black | 160° | 20% | 15% | | 24 | 52 | 37 | H160L20C15 |
| Opulent Green | 160° | 20% | 20% | | 16 | 50 | 34 | H160L20C20 |
| Rich Olive | 160° | 30% | 5% | | 62 | 71 | 64 | H160L30C05 |
| Exclusive Green | 160° | 30% | 10% | | 56 | 73 | 62 | H160L30C10 |
| Leaf Green | 160° | 30% | 15% | | 47 | 73 | 57 | H160L30C15 |
| Mountain Mint | 160° | 30% | 20% | | 37 | 75 | 55 | H160L30C20 |
| Order Green | 160° | 30% | 25% | | 26 | 76 | 50 | H160L30C25 |
| Troll Green | 160° | 30% | 30% | | 1 | 78 | 46 | H160L30C30 |
| Card Table Green | 160° | 30% | 35% | | 0 | 81 | 44 | H160L30C35 |
| Lemon Balm Green | 160° | 30% | 40% | | 0 | 82 | 40 | H160L30C40 |
| Jasper Green | 160° | 40% | 5% | | 87 | 96 | 90 | H160L40C05 |
| Siberian Green | 160° | 40% | 10% | | 78 | 97 | 87 | H160L40C10 |
| Cucumber Green | 160° | 40% | 15% | | 70 | 99 | 83 | H160L40C15 |
| Serbian Green | 160° | 40% | 20% | | 62 | 100 | 79 | H160L40C20 |
| Black Pine Green | 160° | 40% | 25% | | 51 | 101 | 74 | H160L40C25 |
| Pumpkin Green | 160° | 40% | 30% | | 40 | 104 | 72 | H160L40C30 |
| Jade Mussel Green | 160° | 40% | 35% | | 22 | 106 | 69 | H160L40C35 |
| Clover Green | 160° | 40% | 40% | | 0 | 108 | 68 | H160L40C40 |
| Frog Green | 160° | 40% | 45% | | 0 | 105 | 60 | H160L40C45 |
| Universal Green | 160° | 40% | 50% | | 0 | 107 | 56 | H160L40C50 |
| Column Of Oak Green | 160° | 40% | 55% | | 0 | 111 | 55 | H160L40C55 |
| Arctic Lichen Green | 160° | 50% | 5% | | 111 | 120 | 114 | H160L50C05 |
| Atlas Cedar Green | 160° | 50% | 10% | | 102 | 122 | 110 | H160L50C10 |
| Stone Cypress Green | 160° | 50% | 15% | | 95 | 125 | 108 | H160L50C15 |
| Juniper Green | 160° | 50% | 20% | | 86 | 127 | 105 | H160L50C20 |
| Sports Field Green | 160° | 50% | 25% | | 77 | 128 | 100 | H160L50C25 |
| Leisure Green | 160° | 50% | 30% | | 67 | 130 | 97 | H160L50C30 |
| Adamite Green | 160° | 50% | 35% | | 59 | 132 | 94 | H160L50C35 |
| Metallic Green | 160° | 50% | 40% | | 36 | 133 | 91 | H160L50C40 |
| Vital Green | 160° | 50% | 45% | | 19 | 136 | 89 | H160L50C45 |
| Golf Green | 160° | 50% | 50% | | 0 | 136 | 84 | H160L50C50 |
| Iceland Green | 160° | 50% | 55% | | 0 | 139 | 82 | H160L50C55 |
| Real Turquoise | 160° | 50% | 60% | | 0 | 138 | 76 | H160L50C60 |
| Sandstone Grey Green | 160° | 60% | 5% | | 136 | 146 | 140 | H160L60C05 |
| Slate Green | 160° | 60% | 10% | | 127 | 148 | 136 | H160L60C10 |
| Mild Green | 160° | 60% | 15% | | 120 | 152 | 133 | H160L60C15 |
| Douglas Fir Green | 160° | 60% | 20% | | 111 | 152 | 129 | H160L60C20 |
| Practice Green | 160° | 60% | 25% | | 103 | 154 | 124 | H160L60C25 |
| Memphis Green | 160° | 60% | 30% | | 94 | 157 | 123 | H160L60C30 |
| Advertising Green | 160° | 60% | 35% | | 83 | 160 | 121 | H160L60C35 |
| Hunter Green | 160° | 60% | 40% | | 69 | 160 | 116 | H160L60C40 |
| Linoleum Green | 160° | 60% | 45% | | 58 | 163 | 114 | H160L60C45 |
| Parakeet Green | 160° | 60% | 50% | | 26 | 163 | 109 | H160L60C50 |
| Emerald Light Green | 160° | 60% | 55% | | 0 | 162 | 103 | H160L60C55 |
| Alhambra Green | 160° | 60% | 58% | | 0 | 164 | 101 | H160L60C58 |
| Greenish Grey | 160° | 70% | 5% | | 163 | 174 | 167 | H160L70C05 |
| Weak Green | 160° | 70% | 10% | | 153 | 175 | 163 | H160L70C10 |
| Andean Slate | 160° | 70% | 15% | | 144 | 177 | 157 | H160L70C15 |
| Ceramic Green | 160° | 70% | 20% | | 138 | 179 | 155 | H160L70C20 |
| Water Green | 160° | 70% | 25% | | 129 | 184 | 154 | H160L70C25 |
| Mountain Lake Green | 160° | 70% | 30% | | 117 | 185 | 150 | H160L70C30 |
| American Green | 160° | 70% | 35% | | 106 | 186 | 146 | H160L70C35 |
| Techno Turquoise | 160° | 70% | 40% | | 96 | 189 | 142 | H160L70C40 |
| Garish Green | 160° | 70% | 45% | | 81 | 191 | 138 | H160L70C45 |
| Malachite Green | 160° | 70% | 50% | | 68 | 192 | 137 | H160L70C50 |
| Fog Green | 160° | 80% | 5% | | 188 | 200 | 193 | H160L80C05 |
| Matte Jade Green | 160° | 80% | 10% | | 181 | 203 | 189 | H160L80C10 |
| Sun Yellow | 160° | 80% | 15% | | 171 | 206 | 186 | H160L80C15 |
| Feather Green | 160° | 80% | 20% | | 163 | 208 | 182 | H160L80C20 |
| Menthol Green | 160° | 80% | 25% | | 156 | 210 | 180 | H160L80C25 |
| Silk Green | 160° | 80% | 30% | | 148 | 214 | 178 | H160L80C30 |
| Light Green | 160° | 85% | 5% | | 204 | 216 | 208 | H160L85C05 |
| Micaceous Green | 160° | 85% | 10% | | 197 | 218 | 204 | H160L85C10 |
| Moonstone Green | 160° | 85% | 15% | | 189 | 221 | 200 | H160L85C15 |
| Watercolour White | 160° | 90% | 5% | | 219 | 229 | 219 | H160L90C05 |
| Moonlight Green | 160° | 90% | 10% | | 210 | 232 | 216 | H160L90C10 |
| Glacial Water Green | 160° | 90% | 15% | | 201 | 234 | 212 | H160L90C15 |
| Mountain Crystal Silver | 160° | 93% | 5% | | 226 | 239 | 232 | H160L93C05 |
| Deep Green | 170° | 20% | 10% | | 28 | 49 | 41 | H170L20C10 |
| Intense Green | 170° | 20% | 15% | | 18 | 51 | 40 | H170L20C15 |
| Coach Green | 170° | 20% | 20% | | 0 | 53 | 39 | H170L20C20 |
| Off-Road Green | 170° | 20% | 25% | | 0 | 55 | 35 | H170L20C25 |
| Garnet Black Green | 170° | 30% | 10% | | 53 | 74 | 65 | H170L30C10 |
| Dark Green | 170° | 30% | 15% | | 40 | 75 | 62 | H170L30C15 |
| Thistle Green | 170° | 30% | 20% | | 30 | 75 | 59 | H170L30C20 |
| Raspberry Leaf Green | 170° | 30% | 25% | | 4 | 79 | 59 | H170L30C25 |
| Chrysocolla Dark Green | 170° | 30% | 30% | | 0 | 79 | 57 | H170L30C30 |
| Trapper Green | 170° | 30% | 35% | | 0 | 82 | 57 | H170L30C35 |
| Permanent Green | 170° | 30% | 40% | | 0 | 84 | 55 | H170L30C40 |
| Chalcedony Green | 170° | 40% | 10% | | 75 | 96 | 87 | H170L40C10 |
| Palace Green | 170° | 40% | 15% | | 66 | 98 | 85 | H170L40C15 |
| Plantain Green | 170° | 40% | 20% | | 53 | 101 | 84 | H170L40C20 |
| Ore Mountains Green | 170° | 40% | 25% | | 43 | 101 | 81 | H170L40C25 |
| Tractor Green | 170° | 40% | 30% | | 28 | 106 | 81 | H170L40C30 |
| Victoria Green | 170° | 40% | 35% | | 0 | 106 | 77 | H170L40C35 |
| Device Green | 170° | 40% | 40% | | 0 | 107 | 77 | H170L40C40 |
| Environmental Green | 170° | 40% | 45% | | 0 | 108 | 75 | H170L40C45 |
| Vegan Green | 170° | 40% | 50% | | 0 | 108 | 71 | H170L40C50 |
| Bournonite Green | 170° | 50% | 10% | | 99 | 122 | 114 | H170L50C10 |
| Fuchsite Green | 170° | 50% | 15% | | 91 | 126 | 112 | H170L50C15 |
| Blackberry Leaf Green | 170° | 50% | 20% | | 80 | 127 | 109 | H170L50C20 |
| Tourmaline Blue | 170° | 50% | 25% | | 70 | 129 | 108 | H170L50C25 |
| Dream Green | 170° | 50% | 30% | | 53 | 131 | 106 | H170L50C30 |
| Accent Green Blue | 170° | 50% | 35% | | 32 | 132 | 104 | H170L50C35 |
| Spectral Green | 170° | 50% | 40% | | 0 | 134 | 100 | H170L50C40 |
| Mallard Green | 170° | 50% | 45% | | 0 | 135 | 100 | H170L50C45 |
| Chagall Green | 170° | 50% | 50% | | 0 | 139 | 98 | H170L50C50 |
| Absinthe Turquoise | 170° | 50% | 55% | | 0 | 138 | 96 | H170L50C55 |
| Quantum Green | 170° | 60% | 10% | | 124 | 148 | 139 | H170L60C10 |
| Bitter Clover Green | 170° | 60% | 15% | | 118 | 151 | 137 | H170L60C15 |
| Cyprus Green | 170° | 60% | 20% | | 105 | 154 | 136 | H170L60C20 |
| Succulent Green | 170° | 60% | 25% | | 94 | 155 | 134 | H170L60C25 |
| Vibrant Green | 170° | 60% | 30% | | 80 | 157 | 131 | H170L60C30 |
| Klimt Green | 170° | 60% | 35% | | 63 | 162 | 130 | H170L60C35 |
| Persian Green | 170° | 60% | 40% | | 44 | 161 | 128 | H170L60C40 |
| Sport Green | 170° | 60% | 45% | | 0 | 162 | 125 | H170L60C45 |
| Active Green | 170° | 60% | 50% | | 0 | 166 | 126 | H170L60C50 |
| Lovage Green | 170° | 70% | 10% | | 152 | 177 | 166 | H170L70C10 |
| Chrysopal Light Green | 170° | 70% | 15% | | 143 | 178 | 163 | H170L70C15 |
| Source Green | 170° | 70% | 20% | | 132 | 182 | 162 | H170L70C20 |
| Orient Mosaic Green | 170° | 70% | 25% | | 124 | 184 | 161 | H170L70C25 |
| Mint Cold Green | 170° | 70% | 30% | | 108 | 187 | 160 | H170L70C30 |
| Emerald Green | 170° | 70% | 35% | | 95 | 187 | 156 | H170L70C35 |
| Expressionism Green | 170° | 70% | 40% | | 82 | 188 | 154 | H170L70C40 |
| Fluorite Blue | 170° | 80% | 10% | | 180 | 204 | 194 | H170L80C10 |
| Swimming Pool Green | 170° | 80% | 15% | | 168 | 207 | 192 | H170L80C15 |
| Sky Green | 170° | 80% | 20% | | 159 | 211 | 191 | H170L80C20 |
| Larimar Green | 170° | 80% | 25% | | 147 | 211 | 188 | H170L80C25 |
| Silicate Light Turquoise | 170° | 85% | 5% | | 205 | 218 | 211 | H170L85C05 |
| Topaz Green | 170° | 85% | 10% | | 197 | 221 | 208 | H170L85C10 |
| Refrigerator Green | 170° | 85% | 15% | | 186 | 223 | 205 | H170L85C15 |
| Crystal Glass Green | 170° | 85% | 20% | | 177 | 226 | 203 | H170L85C20 |
| Crystal Salt White | 170° | 90% | 5% | | 217 | 229 | 221 | H170L90C05 |
| Turquoise White | 170° | 90% | 10% | | 207 | 233 | 220 | H170L90C10 |
| Snow Crystal Green | 170° | 93% | 5% | | 228 | 240 | 232 | H170L93C05 |
| Pitch Green | 180° | 20% | 5% | | 40 | 51 | 48 | H180L20C05 |
| Lacquer Green | 180° | 20% | 10% | | 27 | 50 | 44 | H180L20C10 |
| Fence Green | 180° | 20% | 15% | | 9 | 51 | 44 | H180L20C15 |
| Myrtle Green | 180° | 20% | 20% | | 0 | 53 | 44 | H180L20C20 |
| Amazon Green | 180° | 30% | 5% | | 63 | 74 | 71 | H180L30C05 |
| Rich Grey Turquoise | 180° | 30% | 10% | | 50 | 73 | 67 | H180L30C10 |
| Blackboard Green | 180° | 30% | 15% | | 39 | 76 | 67 | H180L30C15 |
| Swedish Green | 180° | 30% | 20% | | 24 | 77 | 67 | H180L30C20 |
| Fjord Green | 180° | 30% | 25% | | 0 | 80 | 67 | H180L30C25 |
| Urban Green | 180° | 30% | 30% | | 0 | 80 | 66 | H180L30C30 |
| Jungle Green | 180° | 30% | 35% | | 0 | 83 | 65 | H180L30C35 |
| Earth Green | 180° | 40% | 5% | | 84 | 95 | 91 | H180L40C05 |
| Pine Green | 180° | 40% | 10% | | 74 | 99 | 92 | H180L40C10 |
| Forest Greenery | 180° | 40% | 15% | | 62 | 100 | 91 | H180L40C15 |
| Sea Green | 180° | 40% | 20% | | 48 | 103 | 92 | H180L40C20 |
| Eucalyptus Green | 180° | 40% | 25% | | 30 | 103 | 90 | H180L40C25 |
| Fresh Ivy Green | 180° | 40% | 30% | | 0 | 106 | 91 | H180L40C30 |
| Chrysocolla Medium Green | 180° | 40% | 35% | | 0 | 107 | 87 | H180L40C35 |
| Poster Green | 180° | 40% | 40% | | 0 | 107 | 86 | H180L40C40 |
| Teal Dark Green | 180° | 40% | 45% | | 0 | 109 | 87 | H180L40C45 |
| Dusk Green | 180° | 50% | 5% | | 110 | 122 | 119 | H180L50C05 |
| Refreshing Green | 180° | 50% | 10% | | 97 | 122 | 116 | H180L50C10 |
| Dull Turquoise | 180° | 50% | 15% | | 85 | 125 | 115 | H180L50C15 |
| Azurite Water Green | 180° | 50% | 20% | | 73 | 127 | 115 | H180L50C20 |
| Copper Mineral Green | 180° | 50% | 25% | | 57 | 129 | 116 | H180L50C25 |
| Glass Green | 180° | 50% | 30% | | 35 | 132 | 114 | H180L50C30 |
| Summer Turquoise | 180° | 50% | 35% | | 0 | 133 | 114 | H180L50C35 |
| Christmas Green | 180° | 50% | 40% | | 0 | 133 | 113 | H180L50C40 |
| Industrial Turquoise | 180° | 50% | 45% | | 0 | 138 | 112 | H180L50C45 |
| Ocean Green | 180° | 50% | 50% | | 0 | 138 | 111 | H180L50C50 |
| Marble Green-Grey | 180° | 60% | 5% | | 133 | 146 | 143 | H180L60C05 |
| Tile Green | 180° | 60% | 10% | | 122 | 149 | 142 | H180L60C10 |
| Copper Roof Green | 180° | 60% | 15% | | 111 | 151 | 142 | H180L60C15 |
| Sage Green | 180° | 60% | 20% | | 99 | 154 | 142 | H180L60C20 |
| Petrol Green | 180° | 60% | 25% | | 84 | 155 | 140 | H180L60C25 |
| Dioptase Green | 180° | 60% | 30% | | 67 | 158 | 141 | H180L60C30 |
| Stamp Pad Green | 180° | 60% | 35% | | 46 | 161 | 140 | H180L60C35 |
| Light Turquoise | 180° | 60% | 40% | | 0 | 163 | 140 | H180L60C40 |
| Caribbean Green | 180° | 60% | 45% | | 0 | 165 | 140 | H180L60C45 |
| Brilliant Turquoise | 180° | 60% | 50% | | 0 | 166 | 139 | H180L60C50 |
| Feldspar Silver | 180° | 70% | 5% | | 160 | 173 | 169 | H180L70C05 |
| Delicate Green | 180° | 70% | 10% | | 147 | 176 | 169 | H180L70C10 |
| Silicate Green | 180° | 70% | 15% | | 136 | 178 | 169 | H180L70C15 |
| Mint Bonbon Green | 180° | 70% | 20% | | 125 | 182 | 168 | H180L70C20 |
| Glacial Green | 180° | 70% | 25% | | 111 | 183 | 168 | H180L70C25 |
| Bath Turquoise | 180° | 70% | 30% | | 98 | 186 | 168 | H180L70C30 |
| Mountain Lake Azure | 180° | 70% | 35% | | 76 | 188 | 167 | H180L70C35 |
| Pure Cyan | 180° | 70% | 40% | | 54 | 191 | 168 | H180L70C40 |
| Aragonite White | 180° | 80% | 5% | | 188 | 201 | 195 | H180L80C05 |
| Light Teal | 180° | 80% | 10% | | 177 | 204 | 197 | H180L80C10 |
| Whirlpool Green | 180° | 80% | 15% | | 167 | 208 | 197 | H180L80C15 |
| Opal Turquoise | 180° | 80% | 20% | | 150 | 209 | 195 | H180L80C20 |
| Light Capri Green | 180° | 80% | 25% | | 139 | 212 | 195 | H180L80C25 |
| Tender Turquoise | 180° | 80% | 30% | | 130 | 217 | 197 | H180L80C30 |
| Sea Haze Grey | 180° | 85% | 5% | | 203 | 217 | 212 | H180L85C05 |
| Tierra Del Fuego Sea Green | 180° | 85% | 10% | | 194 | 221 | 211 | H180L85C10 |
| Pale Mountain Lake Turquoise | 180° | 85% | 15% | | 186 | 225 | 211 | H180L85C15 |
| Coral Green | 180° | 85% | 20% | | 171 | 226 | 207 | H180L85C20 |
| Transparent Green | 180° | 90% | 5% | | 217 | 231 | 226 | H180L90C05 |
| Ice Water Green | 180° | 90% | 10% | | 205 | 235 | 225 | H180L90C10 |
| Arctic White | 180° | 93% | 5% | | 229 | 241 | 236 | H180L93C05 |
| Night Turquoise | 190° | 20% | 20% | | 0 | 56 | 51 | H190L20C20 |
| Carriage Green | 190° | 30% | 15% | | 37 | 77 | 72 | H190L30C15 |
| Stockade Green | 190° | 30% | 20% | | 16 | 79 | 74 | H190L30C20 |
| Action Green | 190° | 30% | 25% | | 0 | 80 | 75 | H190L30C25 |
| Myrtle Deep Green | 190° | 30% | 30% | | 0 | 82 | 76 | H190L30C30 |
| Plankton Green | 190° | 30% | 35% | | 0 | 83 | 76 | H190L30C35 |
| Mud Green | 190° | 40% | 10% | | 73 | 98 | 94 | H190L40C10 |
| Moor Pond Green | 190° | 40% | 15% | | 60 | 100 | 97 | H190L40C15 |
| Lush Green | 190° | 40% | 20% | | 41 | 102 | 97 | H190L40C20 |
| Butterfly Green | 190° | 40% | 25% | | 11 | 104 | 99 | H190L40C25 |
| Fashion Blue | 190° | 40% | 30% | | 0 | 107 | 100 | H190L40C30 |
| Office Blue Green | 190° | 40% | 35% | | 0 | 108 | 101 | H190L40C35 |
| Iguana Green | 190° | 40% | 40% | | 0 | 110 | 102 | H190L40C40 |
| Dark Teal | 190° | 40% | 45% | | 0 | 113 | 103 | H190L40C45 |
| Storm Green | 190° | 50% | 10% | | 97 | 124 | 120 | H190L50C10 |
| Dark Turquoise | 190° | 50% | 15% | | 84 | 126 | 121 | H190L50C15 |
| Fir Blue | 190° | 50% | 20% | | 70 | 128 | 123 | H190L50C20 |
| Apatite Blue | 190° | 50% | 25% | | 49 | 130 | 123 | H190L50C25 |
| Egyptian Green | 190° | 50% | 30% | | 8 | 132 | 124 | H190L50C30 |
| Ornamental Turquoise | 190° | 50% | 35% | | 0 | 134 | 125 | H190L50C35 |
| Eyeshadow Turquoise | 190° | 50% | 40% | | 0 | 137 | 128 | H190L50C40 |
| Clear Turquoise | 190° | 50% | 45% | | 0 | 138 | 129 | H190L50C45 |
| Subtle Turquoise | 190° | 60% | 10% | | 122 | 150 | 147 | H190L60C10 |
| Pale Verdigris | 190° | 60% | 15% | | 111 | 152 | 146 | H190L60C15 |
| Goose Pond Green | 190° | 60% | 20% | | 99 | 155 | 149 | H190L60C20 |
| Tourmaline Turquoise | 190° | 60% | 25% | | 79 | 158 | 150 | H190L60C25 |
| Baltic Green | 190° | 60% | 30% | | 58 | 160 | 152 | H190L60C30 |
| Ceramic Blue Turquoise | 190° | 60% | 35% | | 22 | 162 | 154 | H190L60C35 |
| Baltic Turquoise | 190° | 60% | 40% | | 0 | 164 | 154 | H190L60C40 |
| Tyrolite Blue-Green | 190° | 60% | 45% | | 0 | 164 | 153 | H190L60C45 |
| Marble Green | 190° | 70% | 10% | | 149 | 176 | 173 | H190L70C10 |
| Jade Green | 190° | 70% | 15% | | 137 | 179 | 173 | H190L70C15 |
| Spring Water Turquoise | 190° | 70% | 20% | | 122 | 181 | 174 | H190L70C20 |
| Florida Turquoise | 190° | 70% | 25% | | 107 | 184 | 177 | H190L70C25 |
| Hygiene Green | 190° | 70% | 30% | | 93 | 188 | 180 | H190L70C30 |
| Arctic Green | 190° | 70% | 35% | | 69 | 188 | 179 | H190L70C35 |
| Andean Opal Green | 190° | 80% | 10% | | 175 | 205 | 199 | H190L80C10 |
| Cold Turquoise | 190° | 80% | 15% | | 165 | 208 | 203 | H190L80C15 |
| Teal Blue | 190° | 80% | 20% | | 151 | 209 | 203 | H190L80C20 |
| Pool Green | 190° | 80% | 25% | | 136 | 212 | 204 | H190L80C25 |
| Morning Dew White | 190° | 85% | 5% | | 198 | 219 | 214 | H190L85C05 |
| Bath Salt Green | 190° | 85% | 10% | | 187 | 222 | 215 | H190L85C10 |
| Capri Water Blue | 190° | 85% | 15% | | 171 | 226 | 214 | H190L85C15 |
| Horizon Blue | 190° | 85% | 20% | | 157 | 229 | 216 | H190L85C20 |
| Cool White | 190° | 90% | 5% | | 218 | 230 | 226 | H190L90C05 |
| Source Blue | 190° | 90% | 10% | | 205 | 234 | 229 | H190L90C10 |
| Egyptian White | 190° | 93% | 5% | | 229 | 241 | 236 | H190L93C05 |
| Concealed Green | 200° | 20% | 5% | | 38 | 49 | 48 | H200L20C05 |
| Dark Pine Green | 200° | 20% | 10% | | 25 | 50 | 50 | H200L20C10 |
| Roof Tile Green | 200° | 20% | 15% | | 4 | 49 | 50 | H200L20C15 |
| Shrub Green | 200° | 20% | 20% | | 0 | 54 | 54 | H200L20C20 |
| Customs Green | 200° | 20% | 23% | | 0 | 56 | 57 | H200L20C23 |
| Darkness Green | 200° | 30% | 5% | | 58 | 70 | 69 | H200L30C05 |
| Tree Bark Green | 200° | 30% | 10% | | 48 | 75 | 74 | H200L30C10 |
| Hornblende Green | 200° | 30% | 15% | | 35 | 78 | 77 | H200L30C15 |
| Malachite Blue Turquoise | 200° | 30% | 20% | | 14 | 79 | 79 | H200L30C20 |
| Antique Turquoise | 200° | 30% | 25% | | 0 | 78 | 78 | H200L30C25 |
| Wool Turquoise | 200° | 30% | 30% | | 0 | 81 | 82 | H200L30C30 |
| Ice Dark Turquoise | 200° | 30% | 33% | | 0 | 84 | 86 | H200L30C33 |
| Calcite Grey Green | 200° | 40% | 5% | | 82 | 96 | 95 | H200L40C05 |
| Brochantite Green | 200° | 40% | 10% | | 72 | 98 | 98 | H200L40C10 |
| Pyrite Green | 200° | 40% | 15% | | 58 | 99 | 100 | H200L40C15 |
| Dusky Alpine Blue | 200° | 40% | 20% | | 41 | 103 | 103 | H200L40C20 |
| Bath Green | 200° | 40% | 25% | | 10 | 105 | 106 | H200L40C25 |
| Mayan Blue | 200° | 40% | 30% | | 0 | 107 | 108 | H200L40C30 |
| Byzantine Blue | 200° | 40% | 35% | | 0 | 108 | 110 | H200L40C35 |
| Active Turquoise | 200° | 40% | 40% | | 0 | 111 | 114 | H200L40C40 |
| North Grey | 200° | 50% | 5% | | 106 | 119 | 119 | H200L50C05 |
| Eye Grey | 200° | 50% | 10% | | 96 | 123 | 123 | H200L50C10 |
| Nickel Ore Green | 200° | 50% | 15% | | 83 | 126 | 126 | H200L50C15 |
| Seafoam Green | 200° | 50% | 20% | | 66 | 127 | 128 | H200L50C20 |
| Kandinsky Turquoise | 200° | 50% | 25% | | 45 | 130 | 132 | H200L50C25 |
| Caribbean Turquoise | 200° | 50% | 30% | | 0 | 132 | 134 | H200L50C30 |
| Well Blue | 200° | 50% | 35% | | 0 | 136 | 139 | H200L50C35 |
| Industrial Blue | 200° | 50% | 40% | | 0 | 137 | 140 | H200L50C40 |
| India Blue | 200° | 50% | 45% | | 0 | 138 | 142 | H200L50C45 |
| Shady Grey | 200° | 60% | 5% | | 132 | 146 | 146 | H200L60C05 |
| North Cape Grey | 200° | 60% | 10% | | 122 | 149 | 149 | H200L60C10 |
| Woad Indigo | 200° | 60% | 15% | | 108 | 152 | 152 | H200L60C15 |
| Jugendstil Turquoise | 200° | 60% | 20% | | 95 | 155 | 156 | H200L60C20 |
| Coolbox Ice Turquoise | 200° | 60% | 25% | | 73 | 156 | 157 | H200L60C25 |
| Aquamarine Blue | 200° | 60% | 30% | | 49 | 159 | 159 | H200L60C30 |
| Arctic Blue | 200° | 60% | 35% | | 0 | 161 | 163 | H200L60C35 |
| Wax Crayon Blue | 200° | 60% | 40% | | 0 | 164 | 166 | H200L60C40 |
| Prince Grey | 200° | 70% | 5% | | 160 | 173 | 172 | H200L70C05 |
| Calcite Blue | 200° | 70% | 10% | | 148 | 178 | 178 | H200L70C10 |
| Cold Front Green | 200° | 70% | 15% | | 133 | 179 | 178 | H200L70C15 |
| Kingfisher Turquoise | 200° | 70% | 20% | | 122 | 182 | 182 | H200L70C20 |
| Fresh Soft Blue | 200° | 70% | 25% | | 106 | 185 | 187 | H200L70C25 |
| China Light Green | 200° | 80% | 5% | | 188 | 201 | 199 | H200L80C05 |
| Baroque Chalk Soft Blue | 200° | 80% | 10% | | 174 | 204 | 203 | H200L80C10 |
| Ice Boutique Turquoise | 200° | 80% | 15% | | 162 | 205 | 203 | H200L80C15 |
| Summer Soft Blue | 200° | 80% | 20% | | 148 | 211 | 209 | H200L80C20 |
| Mountain Lake Blue | 200° | 80% | 25% | | 133 | 212 | 212 | H200L80C25 |
| Raffia Light Grey | 200° | 85% | 5% | | 203 | 217 | 216 | H200L85C05 |
| Cold Air Turquoise | 200° | 85% | 10% | | 193 | 220 | 219 | H200L85C10 |
| Frosty Soft Blue | 200° | 85% | 15% | | 180 | 224 | 222 | H200L85C15 |
| Ice Crystal Blue | 200° | 85% | 20% | | 166 | 227 | 224 | H200L85C20 |
| Frosty Green | 200° | 90% | 5% | | 217 | 231 | 228 | H200L90C05 |
| Frosty White Blue | 200° | 90% | 10% | | 204 | 233 | 228 | H200L90C10 |
| Chilly White | 200° | 93% | 5% | | 229 | 241 | 237 | H200L93C05 |
| Graphite Black Green | 210° | 30% | 10% | | 50 | 73 | 75 | H210L30C10 |
| Mallard Blue | 210° | 30% | 15% | | 33 | 76 | 79 | H210L30C15 |
| Transporter Green | 210° | 30% | 20% | | 0 | 79 | 84 | H210L30C20 |
| Deep Atlantic Blue | 210° | 30% | 25% | | 0 | 79 | 87 | H210L30C25 |
| Kali Blue | 210° | 30% | 30% | | 0 | 80 | 90 | H210L30C30 |
| Linen Grey | 210° | 40% | 10% | | 70 | 97 | 99 | H210L40C10 |
| China Green Blue | 210° | 40% | 15% | | 58 | 100 | 104 | H210L40C15 |
| Dusk Blue | 210° | 40% | 20% | | 38 | 102 | 107 | H210L40C20 |
| Trouser Blue | 210° | 40% | 25% | | 0 | 102 | 109 | H210L40C25 |
| Indigo Blue | 210° | 40% | 30% | | 0 | 105 | 115 | H210L40C30 |
| Cold Blue | 210° | 40% | 35% | | 0 | 108 | 120 | H210L40C35 |
| Mary Blue | 210° | 40% | 38% | | 0 | 106 | 119 | H210L40C38 |
| Uniform Green Grey | 210° | 50% | 10% | | 95 | 123 | 126 | H210L50C10 |
| Labradorite Green | 210° | 50% | 15% | | 84 | 125 | 128 | H210L50C15 |
| Enamel Antique Green | 210° | 50% | 20% | | 66 | 127 | 133 | H210L50C20 |
| Cranach Blue | 210° | 50% | 25% | | 43 | 130 | 136 | H210L50C25 |
| China Blue | 210° | 50% | 30% | | 0 | 131 | 141 | H210L50C30 |
| Glacier Blue | 210° | 50% | 35% | | 0 | 134 | 145 | H210L50C35 |
| Curaçao Blue | 210° | 50% | 40% | | 0 | 136 | 148 | H210L50C40 |
| Atlantic Blue | 210° | 50% | 45% | | 0 | 137 | 151 | H210L50C45 |
| Ash Blue | 210° | 60% | 10% | | 122 | 149 | 152 | H210L60C10 |
| Baltic Blue | 210° | 60% | 15% | | 108 | 150 | 154 | H210L60C15 |
| Beach Blue | 210° | 60% | 20% | | 95 | 156 | 162 | H210L60C20 |
| Basilica Blue | 210° | 60% | 25% | | 74 | 159 | 167 | H210L60C25 |
| Danube Blue | 210° | 60% | 30% | | 48 | 160 | 170 | H210L60C30 |
| Altdorf Sky Blue | 210° | 60% | 35% | | 0 | 161 | 172 | H210L60C35 |
| Garish Blue | 210° | 60% | 40% | | 0 | 164 | 177 | H210L60C40 |
| Storm Grey | 210° | 70% | 10% | | 149 | 177 | 179 | H210L70C10 |
| Persian Blue | 210° | 70% | 15% | | 137 | 179 | 182 | H210L70C15 |
| Aqua Blue | 210° | 70% | 20% | | 121 | 182 | 188 | H210L70C20 |
| Maritime Soft Blue | 210° | 70% | 25% | | 105 | 184 | 192 | H210L70C25 |
| Mountain Blue | 210° | 70% | 30% | | 83 | 188 | 197 | H210L70C30 |
| Panorama Blue | 210° | 70% | 35% | | 53 | 189 | 200 | H210L70C35 |
| Turquoise Grey | 210° | 80% | 10% | | 180 | 206 | 207 | H210L80C10 |
| Dolphin Blue | 210° | 80% | 15% | | 165 | 209 | 211 | H210L80C15 |
| Aroma Blue | 210° | 80% | 20% | | 150 | 210 | 214 | H210L80C20 |
| Vibrant Soft Blue | 210° | 80% | 25% | | 136 | 214 | 220 | H210L80C25 |
| Siesta White | 210° | 85% | 5% | | 202 | 218 | 218 | H210L85C05 |
| Mint Blue | 210° | 85% | 10% | | 188 | 224 | 223 | H210L85C10 |
| Fine Blue | 210° | 85% | 15% | | 182 | 225 | 225 | H210L85C15 |
| Pale Blue | 210° | 85% | 20% | | 167 | 227 | 226 | H210L85C20 |
| Tulle Soft Blue | 210° | 90% | 5% | | 217 | 231 | 229 | H210L90C05 |
| Antarctic Blue | 210° | 90% | 10% | | 204 | 234 | 231 | H210L90C10 |
| Navy Black | 220° | 20% | 5% | | 38 | 48 | 50 | H220L20C05 |
| Indigo Carmine | 220° | 20% | 10% | | 26 | 51 | 56 | H220L20C10 |
| Artist Blue | 220° | 20% | 15% | | 1 | 52 | 58 | H220L20C15 |
| Natural Indigo | 220° | 20% | 20% | | 0 | 55 | 64 | H220L20C20 |
| Panda Black | 220° | 30% | 5% | | 60 | 71 | 72 | H220L30C05 |
| Pallasite Blue | 220° | 30% | 10% | | 49 | 74 | 78 | H220L30C10 |
| Hurricane Green Blue | 220° | 30% | 15% | | 37 | 77 | 84 | H220L30C15 |
| Watercolour Blue | 220° | 30% | 20% | | 8 | 77 | 88 | H220L30C20 |
| Coral Blue | 220° | 30% | 25% | | 0 | 81 | 93 | H220L30C25 |
| Sandalwood Grey Blue | 220° | 30% | 30% | | 0 | 81 | 96 | H220L30C30 |
| Limousine Grey Blue | 220° | 40% | 5% | | 83 | 95 | 98 | H220L40C05 |
| Corundum Blue | 220° | 40% | 10% | | 74 | 98 | 103 | H220L40C10 |
| Smock Blue | 220° | 40% | 15% | | 59 | 100 | 108 | H220L40C15 |
| Mordant Blue | 220° | 40% | 20% | | 42 | 102 | 113 | H220L40C20 |
| Cotton Indigo | 220° | 40% | 25% | | 6 | 105 | 118 | H220L40C25 |
| Fjord Blue | 220° | 40% | 30% | | 0 | 107 | 125 | H220L40C30 |
| Azure Green Blue | 220° | 40% | 35% | | 0 | 108 | 129 | H220L40C35 |
| Cyan Blue | 220° | 40% | 40% | | 0 | 111 | 134 | H220L40C40 |
| Winter Cloud Grey | 220° | 50% | 5% | | 110 | 122 | 124 | H220L50C05 |
| Cadet Grey | 220° | 50% | 10% | | 99 | 123 | 128 | H220L50C10 |
| Holbein Blue Grey | 220° | 50% | 15% | | 84 | 125 | 134 | H220L50C15 |
| Shady Blue | 220° | 50% | 20% | | 66 | 128 | 138 | H220L50C20 |
| Fresco Blue | 220° | 50% | 25% | | 48 | 129 | 143 | H220L50C25 |
| Craftsman Blue | 220° | 50% | 30% | | 0 | 129 | 147 | H220L50C30 |
| Marker Blue | 220° | 50% | 35% | | 0 | 134 | 154 | H220L50C35 |
| Toy Blue | 220° | 50% | 40% | | 0 | 136 | 159 | H220L50C40 |
| Deep Sea Grey | 220° | 60% | 5% | | 135 | 146 | 148 | H220L60C05 |
| Tile Blue | 220° | 60% | 10% | | 124 | 149 | 155 | H220L60C10 |
| Morning Blue | 220° | 60% | 15% | | 112 | 152 | 160 | H220L60C15 |
| Frost Blue | 220° | 60% | 20% | | 93 | 154 | 166 | H220L60C20 |
| Summer Turquoise Blue | 220° | 60% | 25% | | 75 | 156 | 171 | H220L60C25 |
| Fischer Blue | 220° | 60% | 30% | | 50 | 160 | 177 | H220L60C30 |
| Planet Blue | 220° | 60% | 35% | | 0 | 159 | 179 | H220L60C35 |
| January Blue | 220° | 60% | 40% | | 0 | 161 | 185 | H220L60C40 |
| Tempered Grey | 220° | 70% | 5% | | 161 | 174 | 177 | H220L70C05 |
| Mohair Soft Blue Grey | 220° | 70% | 10% | | 151 | 178 | 183 | H220L70C10 |
| Kitchen Blue | 220° | 70% | 15% | | 138 | 181 | 189 | H220L70C15 |
| Culinary Blue | 220° | 70% | 20% | | 123 | 182 | 193 | H220L70C20 |
| Blouson Blue | 220° | 70% | 25% | | 103 | 183 | 198 | H220L70C25 |
| Mountain Range Blue | 220° | 70% | 30% | | 83 | 184 | 201 | H220L70C30 |
| Holiday Blue | 220° | 70% | 35% | | 50 | 188 | 209 | H220L70C35 |
| Pastel Blue | 220° | 80% | 5% | | 188 | 202 | 202 | H220L80C05 |
| Clinical Soft Blue | 220° | 80% | 10% | | 178 | 207 | 211 | H220L80C10 |
| Children's Soft Blue | 220° | 80% | 15% | | 161 | 206 | 215 | H220L80C15 |
| Tourmaline Water Blue | 220° | 80% | 20% | | 153 | 211 | 223 | H220L80C20 |
| Fresh Blue | 220° | 80% | 25% | | 139 | 214 | 226 | H220L80C25 |
| Transparent Blue | 220° | 85% | 5% | | 205 | 219 | 221 | H220L85C05 |
| Ice Shard Soft Blue | 220° | 85% | 10% | | 193 | 222 | 226 | H220L85C10 |
| Polar Blue | 220° | 85% | 15% | | 179 | 224 | 231 | H220L85C15 |
| Cold Soft Blue | 220° | 90% | 5% | | 217 | 231 | 230 | H220L90C05 |
| Full Moon Grey | 220° | 90% | 10% | | 207 | 234 | 233 | H220L90C10 |
| Ore Bluish Black | 230° | 20% | 10% | | 28 | 51 | 57 | H230L20C10 |
| Firmanent Blue | 230° | 20% | 15% | | 17 | 53 | 63 | H230L20C15 |
| Prussian Blue | 230° | 20% | 20% | | 0 | 52 | 66 | H230L20C20 |
| Galenite Blue | 230° | 30% | 10% | | 55 | 75 | 82 | H230L30C10 |
| Berry Blue Green | 230° | 30% | 15% | | 38 | 75 | 86 | H230L30C15 |
| Teal Dark Blue | 230° | 30% | 20% | | 15 | 77 | 92 | H230L30C20 |
| Thunderstorm Blue | 230° | 30% | 25% | | 0 | 79 | 99 | H230L30C25 |
| Cone Green Blue | 230° | 40% | 10% | | 74 | 97 | 105 | H230L40C10 |
| Juniper Berry Blue | 230° | 40% | 15% | | 63 | 98 | 110 | H230L40C15 |
| Loon Turquoise | 230° | 40% | 20% | | 46 | 102 | 118 | H230L40C20 |
| Workshop Blue | 230° | 40% | 25% | | 2 | 102 | 123 | H230L40C25 |
| Pilot Blue | 230° | 40% | 30% | | 0 | 105 | 129 | H230L40C30 |
| Ink Blue | 230° | 40% | 35% | | 0 | 107 | 136 | H230L40C35 |
| Techno Blue | 230° | 40% | 40% | | 0 | 107 | 139 | H230L40C40 |
| Gravel Grey Blue | 230° | 50% | 10% | | 99 | 122 | 130 | H230L50C10 |
| Spruce Blue | 230° | 50% | 15% | | 87 | 126 | 137 | H230L50C15 |
| Casual Blue | 230° | 50% | 20% | | 73 | 128 | 144 | H230L50C20 |
| Forget-Me-Not Blue | 230° | 50% | 25% | | 53 | 128 | 148 | H230L50C25 |
| Zircon Blue | 230° | 50% | 30% | | 0 | 132 | 157 | H230L50C30 |
| Lagoon Blue | 230° | 50% | 35% | | 0 | 132 | 160 | H230L50C35 |
| Azores Blue | 230° | 50% | 40% | | 0 | 133 | 167 | H230L50C40 |
| Kingfisher Grey | 230° | 60% | 10% | | 126 | 150 | 159 | H230L60C10 |
| Silver Fir Blue | 230° | 60% | 15% | | 113 | 150 | 162 | H230L60C15 |
| Pyjama Blue | 230° | 60% | 20% | | 98 | 153 | 170 | H230L60C20 |
| Starflower Blue | 230° | 60% | 25% | | 78 | 154 | 176 | H230L60C25 |
| Sports Blue | 230° | 60% | 30% | | 57 | 155 | 180 | H230L60C30 |
| Greek Blue | 230° | 60% | 35% | | 0 | 159 | 189 | H230L60C35 |
| Alpine Blue | 230° | 60% | 40% | | 0 | 160 | 195 | H230L60C40 |
| Ice Gull Grey Blue | 230° | 70% | 10% | | 155 | 178 | 186 | H230L70C10 |
| Thistleblossom Soft Blue | 230° | 70% | 15% | | 138 | 179 | 191 | H230L70C15 |
| Tennis Blue | 230° | 70% | 20% | | 124 | 181 | 198 | H230L70C20 |
| Vintage Blue | 230° | 70% | 25% | | 111 | 183 | 204 | H230L70C25 |
| Fitness Blue | 230° | 70% | 30% | | 91 | 185 | 210 | H230L70C30 |
| Pallid Blue | 230° | 80% | 10% | | 179 | 205 | 212 | H230L80C10 |
| Alpine Morning Blue | 230° | 80% | 15% | | 166 | 204 | 216 | H230L80C15 |
| Light Blue | 230° | 80% | 20% | | 155 | 208 | 225 | H230L80C20 |
| Polar Soft Blue | 230° | 85% | 5% | | 208 | 220 | 222 | H230L85C05 |
| Washing Powder White | 230° | 85% | 10% | | 194 | 220 | 227 | H230L85C10 |
| Himalaya White Blue | 230° | 85% | 15% | | 185 | 222 | 233 | H230L85C15 |
| Atmospheric Soft Blue | 230° | 85% | 20% | | 172 | 225 | 240 | H230L85C20 |
| Brilliant White | 230° | 90% | 5% | | 218 | 230 | 229 | H230L90C05 |
| Nightshade Blue | 240° | 20% | 5% | | 41 | 49 | 53 | H240L20C05 |
| Elderberry Black | 240° | 20% | 10% | | 30 | 50 | 59 | H240L20C10 |
| Metal Blue | 240° | 20% | 15% | | 15 | 51 | 65 | H240L20C15 |
| Crowberry Blue | 240° | 20% | 20% | | 0 | 52 | 71 | H240L20C20 |
| Rich Blue | 240° | 20% | 22% | | 0 | 52 | 74 | H240L20C22 |
| Diamond Grey | 240° | 30% | 5% | | 62 | 71 | 75 | H240L30C05 |
| Dirty Blue | 240° | 30% | 10% | | 52 | 73 | 83 | H240L30C10 |
| Deep Sea Blue | 240° | 30% | 15% | | 42 | 75 | 90 | H240L30C15 |
| Lasurite Blue | 240° | 30% | 20% | | 23 | 76 | 96 | H240L30C20 |
| Work Blue | 240° | 30% | 25% | | 0 | 77 | 103 | H240L30C25 |
| Gemstone Blue | 240° | 30% | 30% | | 0 | 79 | 109 | H240L30C30 |
| Captain Blue | 240° | 30% | 35% | | 0 | 81 | 113 | H240L30C35 |
| Blue Anthracite | 240° | 40% | 5% | | 85 | 94 | 100 | H240L40C05 |
| Blackthorn Blue | 240° | 40% | 10% | | 76 | 96 | 107 | H240L40C10 |
| Celeste Blue | 240° | 40% | 15% | | 64 | 99 | 116 | H240L40C15 |
| Denim Blue | 240° | 40% | 20% | | 47 | 100 | 121 | H240L40C20 |
| Orient Blue | 240° | 40% | 25% | | 21 | 102 | 129 | H240L40C25 |
| Sailor Blue | 240° | 40% | 30% | | 0 | 102 | 135 | H240L40C30 |
| Stone Blue | 240° | 40% | 35% | | 0 | 104 | 141 | H240L40C35 |
| Pure Light Blue | 240° | 40% | 40% | | 0 | 106 | 147 | H240L40C40 |
| Smoky Blue | 240° | 50% | 5% | | 111 | 120 | 125 | H240L50C05 |
| Tool Blue | 240° | 50% | 10% | | 99 | 121 | 133 | H240L50C10 |
| Technical Blue | 240° | 50% | 15% | | 88 | 124 | 141 | H240L50C15 |
| Coelin Blue | 240° | 50% | 20% | | 73 | 125 | 147 | H240L50C20 |
| Greenland Blue | 240° | 50% | 25% | | 54 | 127 | 154 | H240L50C25 |
| Summer Blue | 240° | 50% | 30% | | 24 | 128 | 161 | H240L50C30 |
| Advertising Blue | 240° | 50% | 35% | | 0 | 129 | 168 | H240L50C35 |
| Tusche Blue | 240° | 50% | 40% | | 0 | 130 | 173 | H240L50C40 |
| Carrier Pigeon Blue | 240° | 60% | 5% | | 136 | 147 | 152 | H240L60C05 |
| Bird Blue | 240° | 60% | 10% | | 123 | 146 | 158 | H240L60C10 |
| Architecture Blue | 240° | 60% | 15% | | 113 | 149 | 166 | H240L60C15 |
| Shirt Blue | 240° | 60% | 20% | | 101 | 152 | 175 | H240L60C20 |
| Steel Light Blue | 240° | 60% | 25% | | 85 | 153 | 182 | H240L60C25 |
| Fairytale Blue | 240° | 60% | 30% | | 62 | 154 | 189 | H240L60C30 |
| Princess Blue | 240° | 60% | 35% | | 20 | 156 | 196 | H240L60C35 |
| Clear Blue | 240° | 60% | 40% | | 0 | 159 | 200 | H240L60C40 |
| Laundry Blue | 240° | 70% | 5% | | 162 | 173 | 179 | H240L70C05 |
| Eye Blue | 240° | 70% | 10% | | 152 | 175 | 186 | H240L70C10 |
| Bermuda Blue | 240° | 70% | 15% | | 140 | 177 | 194 | H240L70C15 |
| Sea Blue | 240° | 70% | 20% | | 128 | 178 | 201 | H240L70C20 |
| Madonna Blue | 240° | 70% | 25% | | 113 | 181 | 209 | H240L70C25 |
| Caribbean Blue | 240° | 70% | 30% | | 95 | 181 | 214 | H240L70C30 |
| Hazy Blue | 240° | 80% | 5% | | 188 | 200 | 204 | H240L80C05 |
| Light Topaz Soft Blue | 240° | 80% | 10% | | 181 | 205 | 215 | H240L80C10 |
| Baby Blue | 240° | 80% | 15% | | 169 | 205 | 221 | H240L80C15 |
| Crystal Blue | 240° | 80% | 20% | | 155 | 208 | 229 | H240L80C20 |
| Ice Grey | 240° | 85% | 5% | | 206 | 218 | 222 | H240L85C05 |
| Air Blue | 240° | 85% | 10% | | 195 | 219 | 228 | H240L85C10 |
| Paris Blue | 240° | 85% | 15% | | 183 | 221 | 237 | H240L85C15 |
| Soft Blue White | 240° | 90% | 5% | | 218 | 231 | 233 | H240L90C05 |
| Chalky Blue White | 240° | 90% | 10% | | 208 | 235 | 241 | H240L90C10 |
| Cosmos Blue | 250° | 20% | 20% | | 0 | 50 | 73 | H250L20C20 |
| Dark Denim Blue | 250° | 20% | 25% | | 0 | 51 | 79 | H250L20C25 |
| Black Forest Blue | 250° | 30% | 15% | | 41 | 72 | 90 | H250L30C15 |
| Swallow Blue | 250° | 30% | 20% | | 21 | 73 | 98 | H250L30C20 |
| Navy Dark Blue | 250° | 30% | 25% | | 0 | 76 | 106 | H250L30C25 |
| Pompeii Blue | 250° | 30% | 30% | | 0 | 76 | 113 | H250L30C30 |
| Trekking Blue | 250° | 40% | 10% | | 78 | 96 | 109 | H250L40C10 |
| Steel Blue Grey | 250° | 40% | 15% | | 67 | 97 | 117 | H250L40C15 |
| Berry Blue | 250° | 40% | 20% | | 50 | 96 | 122 | H250L40C20 |
| Linen Blue | 250° | 40% | 25% | | 29 | 99 | 131 | H250L40C25 |
| Pool Blue | 250° | 40% | 30% | | 0 | 101 | 140 | H250L40C30 |
| Kingfisher Blue | 250° | 40% | 35% | | 0 | 100 | 145 | H250L40C35 |
| Europe Blue | 250° | 40% | 40% | | 0 | 103 | 150 | H250L40C40 |
| Metal Grey | 250° | 50% | 10% | | 103 | 121 | 134 | H250L50C10 |
| Titanium Blue | 250° | 50% | 15% | | 91 | 121 | 142 | H250L50C15 |
| Mallorca Blue | 250° | 50% | 20% | | 81 | 123 | 149 | H250L50C20 |
| Linoleum Blue | 250° | 50% | 25% | | 66 | 124 | 157 | H250L50C25 |
| Prominent Blue | 250° | 50% | 30% | | 43 | 125 | 166 | H250L50C30 |
| Turkish Blue | 250° | 50% | 35% | | 0 | 127 | 174 | H250L50C35 |
| Primal Blue | 250° | 50% | 40% | | 0 | 129 | 181 | H250L50C40 |
| Bird Blue Grey | 250° | 60% | 10% | | 127 | 146 | 160 | H250L60C10 |
| Gentle Blue | 250° | 60% | 15% | | 118 | 148 | 169 | H250L60C15 |
| Aragonite Blue | 250° | 60% | 20% | | 106 | 149 | 177 | H250L60C20 |
| Pearl Blue | 250° | 60% | 25% | | 93 | 150 | 185 | H250L60C25 |
| Topaz Blue | 250° | 60% | 30% | | 75 | 152 | 192 | H250L60C30 |
| Stratos Blue | 250° | 60% | 35% | | 55 | 153 | 200 | H250L60C35 |
| Structural Blue | 250° | 60% | 40% | | 14 | 155 | 209 | H250L60C40 |
| Foggy Blue | 250° | 70% | 10% | | 153 | 174 | 187 | H250L70C10 |
| Chalk Blue | 250° | 70% | 15% | | 144 | 176 | 196 | H250L70C15 |
| Medium Blue | 250° | 70% | 20% | | 133 | 176 | 204 | H250L70C20 |
| Meadow Blossom Blue | 250° | 70% | 25% | | 122 | 178 | 212 | H250L70C25 |
| Broom Butterfly Blue | 250° | 70% | 30% | | 107 | 179 | 219 | H250L70C30 |
| Light Cyan | 250° | 80% | 10% | | 182 | 202 | 215 | H250L80C10 |
| Himalaya Blue | 250° | 80% | 15% | | 174 | 205 | 224 | H250L80C15 |
| Velvet Blue | 250° | 80% | 20% | | 159 | 202 | 229 | H250L80C20 |
| White Blue | 250° | 85% | 5% | | 205 | 214 | 219 | H250L85C05 |
| Washing Powder Soft Blue | 250° | 85% | 10% | | 195 | 216 | 228 | H250L85C10 |
| Diamond Soft Blue | 250° | 85% | 15% | | 188 | 218 | 236 | H250L85C15 |
| Ice White | 250° | 90% | 5% | | 218 | 227 | 231 | H250L90C05 |
| Blue-Black | 260° | 20% | 5% | | 43 | 48 | 54 | H260L20C05 |
| Nato Blue | 260° | 20% | 10% | | 36 | 49 | 61 | H260L20C10 |
| Suit Blue | 260° | 20% | 15% | | 21 | 48 | 67 | H260L20C15 |
| Halite Blue | 260° | 20% | 20% | | 9 | 50 | 74 | H260L20C20 |
| Alpine Duck Grey | 260° | 30% | 5% | | 64 | 70 | 77 | H260L30C05 |
| Bronze Blue | 260° | 30% | 10% | | 58 | 72 | 86 | H260L30C10 |
| Berlin Blue | 260° | 30% | 15% | | 49 | 72 | 92 | H260L30C15 |
| French Blue | 260° | 30% | 20% | | 38 | 73 | 99 | H260L30C20 |
| Tanzanite Blue | 260° | 30% | 25% | | 17 | 74 | 107 | H260L30C25 |
| Opal Blue | 260° | 30% | 30% | | 0 | 76 | 115 | H260L30C30 |
| Royal Blue | 260° | 30% | 35% | | 0 | 77 | 124 | H260L30C35 |
| Swedish Blue | 260° | 40% | 5% | | 87 | 93 | 100 | H260L40C05 |
| Sheet Blue | 260° | 40% | 10% | | 82 | 97 | 111 | H260L40C10 |
| Plum Blue | 260° | 40% | 15% | | 75 | 97 | 118 | H260L40C15 |
| Cadet Blue | 260° | 40% | 20% | | 61 | 95 | 124 | H260L40C20 |
| Enamel Blue | 260° | 40% | 25% | | 50 | 98 | 133 | H260L40C25 |
| Copenhagen Blue | 260° | 40% | 30% | | 33 | 99 | 139 | H260L40C30 |
| Bauhaus Blue | 260° | 40% | 35% | | 0 | 99 | 146 | H260L40C35 |
| Navy Blue | 260° | 40% | 40% | | 0 | 101 | 157 | H260L40C40 |
| LED Blue | 260° | 40% | 45% | | 0 | 102 | 163 | H260L40C45 |
| Spitsbergen Blue | 260° | 50% | 5% | | 111 | 117 | 125 | H260L50C05 |
| Cypress Grey Blue | 260° | 50% | 10% | | 106 | 119 | 134 | H260L50C10 |
| Mahonia Berry Blue | 260° | 50% | 15% | | 98 | 120 | 142 | H260L50C15 |
| Cropper Blue | 260° | 50% | 20% | | 92 | 123 | 151 | H260L50C20 |
| Biedermeier Blue | 260° | 50% | 25% | | 80 | 124 | 160 | H260L50C25 |
| Beijing Blue | 260° | 50% | 30% | | 62 | 125 | 170 | H260L50C30 |
| Vermeer Blue | 260° | 50% | 35% | | 43 | 124 | 175 | H260L50C35 |
| Meissen Blue | 260° | 50% | 40% | | 0 | 127 | 185 | H260L50C40 |
| Seal Grey | 260° | 60% | 5% | | 138 | 144 | 152 | H260L60C05 |
| Diopside Blue | 260° | 60% | 10% | | 131 | 145 | 160 | H260L60C10 |
| Nordland Blue | 260° | 60% | 15% | | 126 | 149 | 171 | H260L60C15 |
| Cranberry Blue | 260° | 60% | 20% | | 116 | 148 | 177 | H260L60C20 |
| Lupine Blue | 260° | 60% | 25% | | 106 | 150 | 186 | H260L60C25 |
| Blueberry Soft Blue | 260° | 60% | 30% | | 94 | 150 | 195 | H260L60C30 |
| Brilliant Blue | 260° | 60% | 35% | | 79 | 152 | 203 | H260L60C35 |
| Northern Light Grey | 260° | 70% | 5% | | 167 | 174 | 180 | H260L70C05 |
| Petrel Blue Grey | 260° | 70% | 10% | | 160 | 174 | 188 | H260L70C10 |
| Nordland Light Blue | 260° | 70% | 15% | | 150 | 174 | 197 | H260L70C15 |
| Matte Blue | 260° | 70% | 20% | | 143 | 176 | 206 | H260L70C20 |
| Pacific Blue | 260° | 70% | 25% | | 131 | 176 | 214 | H260L70C25 |
| Light Blue Grey | 260° | 80% | 5% | | 192 | 200 | 207 | H260L80C05 |
| Powder Soft Blue | 260° | 80% | 10% | | 185 | 201 | 215 | H260L80C10 |
| Wind Blue | 260° | 80% | 15% | | 177 | 201 | 223 | H260L80C15 |
| Satin White | 260° | 85% | 5% | | 207 | 213 | 219 | H260L85C05 |
| Sea Breeze Green | 260° | 85% | 10% | | 201 | 217 | 231 | H260L85C10 |
| Milk Blue | 260° | 90% | 5% | | 220 | 227 | 231 | H260L90C05 |
| Crow Black Blue | 270° | 20% | 20% | | 17 | 47 | 75 | H270L20C20 |
| Indigo Black | 270° | 20% | 25% | | 0 | 46 | 81 | H270L20C25 |
| Effervescent Blue | 270° | 20% | 29% | | 0 | 49 | 90 | H270L20C29 |
| Midnight Blue | 270° | 30% | 15% | | 54 | 71 | 92 | H270L30C15 |
| Dark Blue | 270° | 30% | 20% | | 46 | 71 | 100 | H270L30C20 |
| Grape Blue | 270° | 30% | 25% | | 36 | 72 | 108 | H270L30C25 |
| Medici Blue | 270° | 30% | 30% | | 16 | 71 | 115 | H270L30C30 |
| Kolibri Blue | 270° | 30% | 35% | | 0 | 71 | 122 | H270L30C35 |
| Prince Blue | 270° | 30% | 40% | | 0 | 72 | 131 | H270L30C40 |
| Pewter Grey | 270° | 40% | 15% | | 79 | 95 | 118 | H270L40C15 |
| Parlour Blue | 270° | 40% | 20% | | 70 | 95 | 126 | H270L40C20 |
| Functional Blue | 270° | 40% | 25% | | 63 | 96 | 134 | H270L40C25 |
| Make-Up Blue | 270° | 40% | 30% | | 51 | 95 | 141 | H270L40C30 |
| Lapis Lazuli Blue | 270° | 40% | 35% | | 33 | 95 | 150 | H270L40C35 |
| Magic Blue | 270° | 40% | 40% | | 0 | 95 | 157 | H270L40C40 |
| Brocade Blue | 270° | 50% | 10% | | 109 | 120 | 136 | H270L50C10 |
| Noble Blue | 270° | 50% | 15% | | 105 | 121 | 145 | H270L50C15 |
| Delft Blue | 270° | 50% | 20% | | 96 | 121 | 153 | H270L50C20 |
| Cocktail Blue | 270° | 50% | 25% | | 90 | 122 | 162 | H270L50C25 |
| Sage Blossom Blue | 270° | 50% | 30% | | 78 | 120 | 169 | H270L50C30 |
| Viennese Blue | 270° | 50% | 35% | | 66 | 120 | 175 | H270L50C35 |
| Cornflower Blue | 270° | 50% | 40% | | 50 | 122 | 185 | H270L50C40 |
| Fantasy Grey | 270° | 60% | 10% | | 133 | 145 | 162 | H270L60C10 |
| Lilac Blue | 270° | 60% | 15% | | 130 | 147 | 172 | H270L60C15 |
| Lavender Blue | 270° | 60% | 20% | | 123 | 147 | 180 | H270L60C20 |
| Delphinium Blue | 270° | 60% | 25% | | 116 | 148 | 188 | H270L60C25 |
| Eyeshadow Blue | 270° | 60% | 30% | | 107 | 148 | 197 | H270L60C30 |
| Butterfly Blue | 270° | 60% | 35% | | 95 | 147 | 204 | H270L60C35 |
| Feather Soft Blue | 270° | 70% | 10% | | 162 | 174 | 191 | H270L70C10 |
| Satin Soft Blue | 270° | 70% | 15% | | 156 | 173 | 199 | H270L70C15 |
| Angel Blue | 270° | 70% | 20% | | 150 | 174 | 208 | H270L70C20 |
| Boy Blue | 270° | 70% | 25% | | 140 | 172 | 214 | H270L70C25 |
| Light Pearl Soft Blue | 270° | 80% | 10% | | 190 | 200 | 216 | H270L80C10 |
| Retina Soft Blue | 270° | 80% | 15% | | 182 | 199 | 224 | H270L80C15 |
| Angel Hair Silver | 270° | 85% | 5% | | 210 | 214 | 219 | H270L85C05 |
| Mother-Of-Pearl Silver | 270° | 85% | 10% | | 204 | 214 | 230 | H270L85C10 |
| Murano Soft Blue | 270° | 85% | 15% | | 197 | 214 | 238 | H270L85C15 |
| Bleached White | 270° | 90% | 5% | | 223 | 227 | 232 | H270L90C05 |
| Granite Black | 280° | 20% | 5% | | 49 | 50 | 56 | H280L20C05 |
| Diamond Black | 280° | 20% | 10% | | 43 | 48 | 62 | H280L20C10 |
| Crow Black | 280° | 20% | 15% | | 38 | 49 | 69 | H280L20C15 |
| Manganese Black | 280° | 20% | 20% | | 32 | 47 | 75 | H280L20C20 |
| Elite Blue | 280° | 20% | 25% | | 27 | 48 | 83 | H280L20C25 |
| Ambassador Blue | 280° | 20% | 30% | | 13 | 47 | 90 | H280L20C30 |
| Smoking Night Blue | 280° | 30% | 5% | | 67 | 69 | 76 | H280L30C05 |
| Meteorite Black Blue | 280° | 30% | 10% | | 65 | 71 | 86 | H280L30C10 |
| Anthracite Blue | 280° | 30% | 15% | | 61 | 71 | 94 | H280L30C15 |
| Garnet Stone Blue | 280° | 30% | 20% | | 56 | 72 | 102 | H280L30C20 |
| Hydrogen Blue | 280° | 30% | 25% | | 51 | 71 | 109 | H280L30C25 |
| Deep Blue | 280° | 30% | 30% | | 38 | 70 | 116 | H280L30C30 |
| Theatre Blue | 280° | 30% | 35% | | 33 | 70 | 122 | H280L30C35 |
| Poster Blue | 280° | 30% | 40% | | 19 | 70 | 130 | H280L30C40 |
| Gallery Grey | 280° | 40% | 5% | | 91 | 93 | 101 | H280L40C05 |
| Suede Indigo | 280° | 40% | 10% | | 88 | 93 | 109 | H280L40C10 |
| Dark Lavender | 280° | 40% | 15% | | 84 | 94 | 118 | H280L40C15 |
| Starry Sky Blue | 280° | 40% | 20% | | 79 | 94 | 126 | H280L40C20 |
| Indigo Navy Blue | 280° | 40% | 25% | | 76 | 94 | 135 | H280L40C25 |
| Evening Blue | 280° | 40% | 30% | | 68 | 94 | 141 | H280L40C30 |
| Portuguese Blue | 280° | 40% | 35% | | 60 | 94 | 149 | H280L40C35 |
| Neptune Blue | 280° | 40% | 40% | | 46 | 93 | 157 | H280L40C40 |
| Hyacinth Blue | 280° | 40% | 45% | | 30 | 93 | 165 | H280L40C45 |
| Noble Grey | 280° | 50% | 5% | | 115 | 119 | 127 | H280L50C05 |
| Ice Blue Grey | 280° | 50% | 10% | | 113 | 119 | 135 | H280L50C10 |
| Granite Blue | 280° | 50% | 15% | | 109 | 119 | 143 | H280L50C15 |
| Lavender Mauve | 280° | 50% | 20% | | 104 | 118 | 152 | H280L50C20 |
| Costume Blue | 280° | 50% | 25% | | 100 | 119 | 160 | H280L50C25 |
| Light Mauve | 280° | 50% | 30% | | 95 | 118 | 168 | H280L50C30 |
| Sapphire Shimmer Blue | 280° | 50% | 35% | | 87 | 118 | 175 | H280L50C35 |
| Diva Violet | 280° | 50% | 40% | | 80 | 119 | 186 | H280L50C40 |
| Tulle Grey | 280° | 60% | 5% | | 141 | 144 | 152 | H280L60C05 |
| Sweet Lavender | 280° | 60% | 10% | | 137 | 143 | 160 | H280L60C10 |
| Marble Blue | 280° | 60% | 15% | | 134 | 143 | 169 | H280L60C15 |
| Misty Violet | 280° | 60% | 20% | | 131 | 144 | 179 | H280L60C20 |
| Opal Violet | 280° | 60% | 25% | | 126 | 143 | 187 | H280L60C25 |
| Persian Violet | 280° | 60% | 30% | | 121 | 144 | 194 | H280L60C30 |
| Organza Violet | 280° | 60% | 35% | | 115 | 145 | 204 | H280L60C35 |
| Taupe Grey | 280° | 70% | 5% | | 167 | 169 | 177 | H280L70C05 |
| Tulle Violet | 280° | 70% | 10% | | 166 | 172 | 188 | H280L70C10 |
| Foxflower Viola | 280° | 70% | 15% | | 162 | 172 | 197 | H280L70C15 |
| Lilac Scent Soft Blue | 280° | 70% | 20% | | 158 | 171 | 208 | H280L70C20 |
| Aster Flower Blue | 280° | 70% | 25% | | 155 | 172 | 216 | H280L70C25 |
| Viola Ice Grey | 280° | 80% | 5% | | 198 | 200 | 208 | H280L80C05 |
| Hyacinth White Soft Blue | 280° | 80% | 10% | | 193 | 199 | 215 | H280L80C10 |
| Violet Scent Soft Blue | 280° | 80% | 15% | | 188 | 198 | 223 | H280L80C15 |
| Pebble Soft Blue White | 280° | 85% | 5% | | 211 | 215 | 220 | H280L85C05 |
| Jewellery White | 280° | 85% | 10% | | 206 | 214 | 230 | H280L85C10 |
| Mauve White | 280° | 90% | 5% | | 223 | 227 | 232 | H280L90C05 |
| Porcelain White | 280° | 93% | 5% | | 234 | 237 | 242 | H280L93C05 |
| Spinel Stone Black | 290° | 20% | 10% | | 39 | 42 | 59 | H290L20C10 |
| Black Violet | 290° | 20% | 15% | | 43 | 44 | 66 | H290L20C15 |
| Tropical Night Blue | 290° | 20% | 20% | | 42 | 46 | 76 | H290L20C20 |
| Indigo Violet | 290° | 20% | 25% | | 36 | 44 | 82 | H290L20C25 |
| Ultramarine Violet | 290° | 20% | 30% | | 29 | 42 | 88 | H290L20C30 |
| Schiava Blue | 290° | 20% | 35% | | 25 | 41 | 97 | H290L20C35 |
| Flintstone Blue | 290° | 30% | 10% | | 67 | 66 | 82 | H290L30C10 |
| Spinel Black | 290° | 30% | 15% | | 65 | 67 | 91 | H290L30C15 |
| Church Blue | 290° | 30% | 20% | | 61 | 65 | 97 | H290L30C20 |
| Gloomy Blue | 290° | 30% | 25% | | 60 | 65 | 106 | H290L30C25 |
| Lviv Blue | 290° | 30% | 30% | | 56 | 65 | 114 | H290L30C30 |
| British Mauve | 290° | 30% | 35% | | 53 | 66 | 123 | H290L30C35 |
| Official Violet | 290° | 30% | 40% | | 46 | 65 | 130 | H290L30C40 |
| Shearwater Black | 290° | 40% | 10% | | 91 | 91 | 108 | H290L40C10 |
| Agate Violet | 290° | 40% | 15% | | 90 | 91 | 116 | H290L40C15 |
| Deep Lavender | 290° | 40% | 20% | | 86 | 90 | 125 | H290L40C20 |
| Dusk Mauve | 290° | 40% | 25% | | 84 | 88 | 131 | H290L40C25 |
| Rich Violet | 290° | 40% | 30% | | 80 | 87 | 139 | H290L40C30 |
| Onion Skin Blue | 290° | 40% | 35% | | 76 | 86 | 146 | H290L40C35 |
| Iris Blue | 290° | 40% | 40% | | 73 | 88 | 156 | H290L40C40 |
| Violet Blue | 290° | 40% | 45% | | 65 | 87 | 162 | H290L40C45 |
| Ash Mauve | 290° | 50% | 10% | | 115 | 116 | 134 | H290L50C10 |
| Stormy Mauve | 290° | 50% | 15% | | 113 | 115 | 140 | H290L50C15 |
| Silk Crepe Mauve | 290° | 50% | 20% | | 110 | 113 | 150 | H290L50C20 |
| Hyacinth Mauve | 290° | 50% | 25% | | 111 | 114 | 159 | H290L50C25 |
| Mountain Flower Mauve | 290° | 50% | 30% | | 108 | 113 | 166 | H290L50C30 |
| Chalcedony Violet | 290° | 50% | 35% | | 103 | 112 | 174 | H290L50C35 |
| Gladiola Blue | 290° | 50% | 40% | | 99 | 112 | 182 | H290L50C40 |
| Lavender Blossom Grey | 290° | 60% | 10% | | 140 | 141 | 161 | H290L60C10 |
| Delicate Violet | 290° | 60% | 15% | | 140 | 141 | 168 | H290L60C15 |
| Opera Mauve | 290° | 60% | 20% | | 135 | 139 | 177 | H290L60C20 |
| Soft Blue Lavender | 290° | 60% | 25% | | 136 | 140 | 186 | H290L60C25 |
| Pleated Mauve | 290° | 60% | 30% | | 133 | 139 | 194 | H290L60C30 |
| True Lavender | 290° | 60% | 35% | | 126 | 137 | 200 | H290L60C35 |
| Cream Violet | 290° | 70% | 10% | | 169 | 170 | 189 | H290L70C10 |
| Wisteria Light Soft Blue | 290° | 70% | 15% | | 166 | 168 | 197 | H290L70C15 |
| Blossom Mauve | 290° | 70% | 20% | | 163 | 167 | 204 | H290L70C20 |
| Sorbet Ice Mauve | 290° | 70% | 25% | | 161 | 166 | 214 | H290L70C25 |
| Tulip Soft Blue | 290° | 80% | 10% | | 195 | 196 | 214 | H290L80C10 |
| Pale Lilac | 290° | 80% | 15% | | 195 | 196 | 221 | H290L80C15 |
| Limestone Mauve | 290° | 85% | 5% | | 214 | 215 | 219 | H290L85C05 |
| Orchid White | 290° | 85% | 10% | | 209 | 213 | 234 | H290L85C10 |
| Violet White | 290° | 90% | 5% | | 226 | 227 | 233 | H290L90C05 |
| Lilac White | 290° | 93% | 5% | | 234 | 236 | 241 | H290L93C05 |
| Night Black | 300° | 20% | 5% | | 49 | 47 | 54 | H300L20C05 |
| Heron Blue | 300° | 20% | 10% | | 47 | 43 | 58 | H300L20C10 |
| Viola Black | 300° | 20% | 15% | | 47 | 42 | 65 | H300L20C15 |
| Blackberry Black | 300° | 20% | 20% | | 46 | 40 | 72 | H300L20C20 |
| Cardinal Mauve | 300° | 20% | 25% | | 44 | 40 | 76 | H300L20C25 |
| Ceremonial Purple | 300° | 20% | 30% | | 42 | 39 | 86 | H300L20C30 |
| Night Grey | 300° | 30% | 5% | | 70 | 68 | 76 | H300L30C05 |
| Mourning Violet | 300° | 30% | 10% | | 71 | 67 | 84 | H300L30C10 |
| Club Grey | 300° | 30% | 15% | | 70 | 65 | 89 | H300L30C15 |
| Mulberry Mauve Black | 300° | 30% | 20% | | 70 | 63 | 96 | H300L30C20 |
| Evening Mauve | 300° | 30% | 25% | | 70 | 63 | 103 | H300L30C25 |
| Opera Blue | 300° | 30% | 30% | | 69 | 62 | 110 | H300L30C30 |
| Deep Violet | 300° | 30% | 35% | | 68 | 62 | 117 | H300L30C35 |
| Sage Violet | 300° | 30% | 40% | | 65 | 60 | 123 | H300L30C40 |
| Baroque Grey | 300° | 40% | 5% | | 95 | 93 | 100 | H300L40C05 |
| Gobelin Mauve | 300° | 40% | 10% | | 94 | 90 | 106 | H300L40C10 |
| Orchid Grey | 300° | 40% | 15% | | 94 | 88 | 113 | H300L40C15 |
| Old Mauve | 300° | 40% | 20% | | 95 | 87 | 121 | H300L40C20 |
| Parma Mauve | 300° | 40% | 25% | | 95 | 86 | 128 | H300L40C25 |
| Wool Violet | 300° | 40% | 30% | | 94 | 85 | 135 | H300L40C30 |
| Fine Purple | 300° | 40% | 35% | | 94 | 84 | 141 | H300L40C35 |
| Clematis Blue | 300° | 40% | 40% | | 90 | 82 | 147 | H300L40C40 |
| Coronation Blue | 300° | 40% | 45% | | 89 | 82 | 156 | H300L40C45 |
| Hawk Grey | 300° | 50% | 5% | | 119 | 117 | 125 | H300L50C05 |
| Violet Grey | 300° | 50% | 10% | | 120 | 115 | 132 | H300L50C10 |
| Capercaillie Mauve | 300° | 50% | 15% | | 120 | 114 | 140 | H300L50C15 |
| Parisian Violet | 300° | 50% | 20% | | 120 | 112 | 147 | H300L50C20 |
| Tulip Violet | 300° | 50% | 25% | | 119 | 111 | 154 | H300L50C25 |
| Toy Mauve | 300° | 50% | 30% | | 119 | 110 | 162 | H300L50C30 |
| Wintertime Mauve | 300° | 50% | 35% | | 120 | 109 | 170 | H300L50C35 |
| Clear Mauve | 300° | 50% | 40% | | 118 | 108 | 176 | H300L50C40 |
| Partridge Grey | 300° | 60% | 5% | | 145 | 144 | 152 | H300L60C05 |
| Rose Grey | 300° | 60% | 10% | | 146 | 141 | 159 | H300L60C10 |
| Antique Viola | 300° | 60% | 15% | | 146 | 139 | 166 | H300L60C15 |
| Larkspur Violet | 300° | 60% | 20% | | 146 | 138 | 174 | H300L60C20 |
| Silk Lilac | 300° | 60% | 25% | | 145 | 136 | 181 | H300L60C25 |
| Heliotropic Mauve | 300° | 60% | 30% | | 145 | 135 | 189 | H300L60C30 |
| Amethyst Grey | 300° | 60% | 35% | | 144 | 133 | 196 | H300L60C35 |
| Velvet Grey | 300° | 70% | 5% | | 172 | 170 | 179 | H300L70C05 |
| Morning Mist Grey | 300° | 70% | 10% | | 173 | 167 | 185 | H300L70C10 |
| Eyeshadow Viola | 300° | 70% | 15% | | 173 | 166 | 194 | H300L70C15 |
| Lavender Violet | 300° | 70% | 20% | | 174 | 166 | 201 | H300L70C20 |
| Pink Lavender | 300° | 70% | 25% | | 173 | 163 | 209 | H300L70C25 |
| Hazy Mauve | 300° | 80% | 5% | | 200 | 198 | 206 | H300L80C05 |
| Pale Violet | 300° | 80% | 10% | | 198 | 195 | 214 | H300L80C10 |
| Ice Mauve | 300° | 80% | 15% | | 201 | 194 | 221 | H300L80C15 |
| Delicate Viola | 300° | 85% | 5% | | 215 | 214 | 220 | H300L85C05 |
| Powder Viola White | 300° | 85% | 10% | | 217 | 211 | 229 | H300L85C10 |
| Translucent White | 300° | 90% | 5% | | 228 | 227 | 233 | H300L90C05 |
| Obsidian Lava Black | 310° | 20% | 20% | | 56 | 43 | 70 | H310L20C20 |
| Operetta Mauve | 310° | 20% | 25% | | 58 | 40 | 76 | H310L20C25 |
| Powerful Violet | 310° | 20% | 30% | | 55 | 34 | 82 | H310L20C30 |
| Dark Grey Mauve | 310° | 30% | 15% | | 78 | 68 | 89 | H310L30C15 |
| Powerful Mauve | 310° | 30% | 20% | | 76 | 63 | 93 | H310L30C20 |
| English Violet | 310° | 30% | 25% | | 81 | 62 | 100 | H310L30C25 |
| Crystal Purple | 310° | 30% | 30% | | 83 | 61 | 107 | H310L30C30 |
| Succinct Violet | 310° | 30% | 35% | | 81 | 59 | 110 | H310L30C35 |
| Loden Purple | 310° | 30% | 40% | | 85 | 58 | 118 | H310L30C40 |
| Dark Pink | 310° | 40% | 10% | | 100 | 91 | 107 | H310L40C10 |
| Violet Haze | 310° | 40% | 15% | | 103 | 91 | 114 | H310L40C15 |
| Indigo Red | 310° | 40% | 20% | | 105 | 90 | 120 | H310L40C20 |
| Charoite Violet | 310° | 40% | 25% | | 106 | 87 | 127 | H310L40C25 |
| Royal Purple | 310° | 40% | 30% | | 106 | 83 | 131 | H310L40C30 |
| Magenta Violet | 310° | 40% | 35% | | 108 | 83 | 137 | H310L40C35 |
| Pure Mauve | 310° | 40% | 40% | | 111 | 83 | 144 | H310L40C40 |
| Dull Mauve | 310° | 50% | 10% | | 125 | 116 | 133 | H310L50C10 |
| Batik Lilac | 310° | 50% | 15% | | 126 | 115 | 139 | H310L50C15 |
| Provence Violet | 310° | 50% | 20% | | 130 | 113 | 145 | H310L50C20 |
| Baroness Mauve | 310° | 50% | 25% | | 132 | 112 | 152 | H310L50C25 |
| Bitter Violet | 310° | 50% | 30% | | 133 | 109 | 158 | H310L50C30 |
| Violet Rose | 310° | 50% | 35% | | 132 | 107 | 163 | H310L50C35 |
| Orchid Mauve | 310° | 50% | 40% | | 134 | 106 | 170 | H310L50C40 |
| Gentle Mauve | 310° | 60% | 10% | | 149 | 140 | 158 | H310L60C10 |
| Smoky Mauve | 310° | 60% | 15% | | 153 | 139 | 165 | H310L60C15 |
| Saffron Blossom Mauve | 310° | 60% | 20% | | 156 | 138 | 171 | H310L60C20 |
| Flirty Pink | 310° | 60% | 25% | | 158 | 136 | 177 | H310L60C25 |
| Peony Mauve | 310° | 60% | 30% | | 159 | 134 | 183 | H310L60C30 |
| Lilac Purple | 310° | 60% | 35% | | 161 | 131 | 192 | H310L60C35 |
| Amorphous Rose | 310° | 70% | 10% | | 177 | 167 | 183 | H310L70C10 |
| Transparent Mauve | 310° | 70% | 15% | | 180 | 166 | 191 | H310L70C15 |
| Blue Pink | 310° | 70% | 20% | | 181 | 163 | 197 | H310L70C20 |
| Glass Violet | 310° | 70% | 25% | | 183 | 162 | 204 | H310L70C25 |
| Powder Viola | 310° | 80% | 10% | | 203 | 194 | 211 | H310L80C10 |
| Orchid Violet | 310° | 80% | 15% | | 207 | 193 | 218 | H310L80C15 |
| Fairy Pink | 310° | 85% | 5% | | 215 | 213 | 219 | H310L85C05 |
| Tricot Lilac White | 310° | 85% | 10% | | 220 | 211 | 227 | H310L85C10 |
| Wallflower White | 310° | 90% | 5% | | 231 | 227 | 231 | H310L90C05 |
| Lava Black | 320° | 20% | 5% | | 53 | 47 | 54 | H320L20C05 |
| Obsidian Red | 320° | 20% | 10% | | 55 | 42 | 56 | H320L20C10 |
| Spinel Violet | 320° | 20% | 15% | | 56 | 40 | 61 | H320L20C15 |
| Aubergine Mauve | 320° | 20% | 20% | | 59 | 39 | 65 | H320L20C20 |
| Dark Purple | 320° | 20% | 25% | | 60 | 34 | 70 | H320L20C25 |
| Violet Black | 320° | 30% | 5% | | 73 | 67 | 74 | H320L30C05 |
| Stone Violet | 320° | 30% | 10% | | 77 | 64 | 79 | H320L30C10 |
| Amethyst Dark Violet | 320° | 30% | 15% | | 79 | 60 | 82 | H320L30C15 |
| Dark Blackberry | 320° | 30% | 20% | | 83 | 57 | 88 | H320L30C20 |
| Purpurite Violet | 320° | 30% | 25% | | 87 | 56 | 94 | H320L30C25 |
| Damson Mauve | 320° | 30% | 30% | | 88 | 53 | 99 | H320L30C30 |
| Grape Purple | 320° | 30% | 35% | | 90 | 52 | 104 | H320L30C35 |
| Lounge Violet | 320° | 30% | 37% | | 94 | 51 | 109 | H320L30C37 |
| Slate Mauve | 320° | 40% | 5% | | 98 | 92 | 99 | H320L40C05 |
| Olivine Basalt | 320° | 40% | 10% | | 101 | 88 | 103 | H320L40C10 |
| Antique Grey | 320° | 40% | 15% | | 105 | 87 | 109 | H320L40C15 |
| Basil Mauve | 320° | 40% | 20% | | 108 | 84 | 114 | H320L40C20 |
| Gladiola Violet | 320° | 40% | 25% | | 110 | 81 | 120 | H320L40C25 |
| Cabbage Blossom Violet | 320° | 40% | 30% | | 114 | 76 | 123 | H320L40C30 |
| Lilac Violet | 320° | 40% | 35% | | 117 | 74 | 128 | H320L40C35 |
| Violet Purple | 320° | 40% | 40% | | 120 | 72 | 136 | H320L40C40 |
| Grey Violet | 320° | 50% | 5% | | 120 | 115 | 122 | H320L50C05 |
| British Grey Mauve | 320° | 50% | 10% | | 125 | 112 | 129 | H320L50C10 |
| Parma Grey | 320° | 50% | 15% | | 128 | 110 | 133 | H320L50C15 |
| Cyclamen | 320° | 50% | 20% | | 135 | 109 | 140 | H320L50C20 |
| Poetry Mauve | 320° | 50% | 25% | | 136 | 104 | 145 | H320L50C25 |
| Viola Grey | 320° | 50% | 30% | | 140 | 104 | 151 | H320L50C30 |
| Aster Violetta | 320° | 50% | 35% | | 143 | 98 | 154 | H320L50C35 |
| Empire Violet | 320° | 50% | 40% | | 146 | 100 | 162 | H320L50C40 |
| Aragonite Grey | 320° | 60% | 5% | | 148 | 142 | 150 | H320L60C05 |
| Chalk Violet | 320° | 60% | 10% | | 152 | 140 | 155 | H320L60C10 |
| Amethyst Grey Violet | 320° | 60% | 15% | | 156 | 137 | 161 | H320L60C15 |
| Wonder Violet | 320° | 60% | 20% | | 160 | 133 | 166 | H320L60C20 |
| Nightshade Violet | 320° | 60% | 25% | | 163 | 131 | 172 | H320L60C25 |
| Lobby Lilac | 320° | 60% | 30% | | 167 | 128 | 178 | H320L60C30 |
| Blackberry Sorbet | 320° | 60% | 35% | | 169 | 126 | 182 | H320L60C35 |
| Elderberry Grey | 320° | 70% | 5% | | 174 | 168 | 176 | H320L70C05 |
| Bellflower Violet | 320° | 70% | 10% | | 178 | 165 | 183 | H320L70C10 |
| Quartz Violet | 320° | 70% | 15% | | 181 | 162 | 188 | H320L70C15 |
| Beach Lilac | 320° | 70% | 20% | | 189 | 162 | 196 | H320L70C20 |
| Lilac Pink | 320° | 70% | 25% | | 192 | 157 | 200 | H320L70C25 |
| Light Violet | 320° | 80% | 5% | | 203 | 196 | 203 | H320L80C05 |
| Amethyst Light Violet | 320° | 80% | 10% | | 207 | 194 | 209 | H320L80C10 |
| Cosmetic Mauve | 320° | 80% | 15% | | 211 | 190 | 213 | H320L80C15 |
| Blackberry Cream | 320° | 85% | 5% | | 217 | 211 | 218 | H320L85C05 |
| Ametrine Quartz | 320° | 85% | 10% | | 222 | 209 | 224 | H320L85C10 |
| Apatite Pink | 320° | 90% | 5% | | 232 | 225 | 230 | H320L90C05 |
| Profound Mauve | 330° | 20% | 20% | | 64 | 36 | 61 | H330L20C20 |
| Opulent Mauve | 330° | 20% | 25% | | 70 | 35 | 67 | H330L20C25 |
| Currant Violet | 330° | 30% | 15% | | 85 | 62 | 81 | H330L30C15 |
| Mexican Purple | 330° | 30% | 20% | | 90 | 60 | 85 | H330L30C20 |
| Parma Plum Red | 330° | 30% | 25% | | 94 | 57 | 88 | H330L30C25 |
| Intense Purple | 330° | 30% | 30% | | 99 | 54 | 93 | H330L30C30 |
| Opulent Purple | 330° | 30% | 35% | | 103 | 51 | 98 | H330L30C35 |
| Intense Mauve | 330° | 30% | 40% | | 104 | 45 | 99 | H330L30C40 |
| Patina Violet | 330° | 40% | 10% | | 105 | 90 | 103 | H330L40C10 |
| Dark Purple Grey | 330° | 40% | 15% | | 110 | 87 | 107 | H330L40C15 |
| Amaranth Red | 330° | 40% | 20% | | 114 | 86 | 112 | H330L40C20 |
| Deep Magenta | 330° | 40% | 25% | | 119 | 83 | 115 | H330L40C25 |
| Phloxflower Violet | 330° | 40% | 30% | | 127 | 79 | 120 | H330L40C30 |
| Thistle Mauve | 330° | 40% | 35% | | 131 | 77 | 124 | H330L40C35 |
| Visiona Red | 330° | 40% | 40% | | 131 | 71 | 125 | H330L40C40 |
| Purpurite Red | 330° | 40% | 45% | | 134 | 68 | 128 | H330L40C45 |
| Burlap Grey | 330° | 50% | 10% | | 129 | 113 | 126 | H330L50C10 |
| Sapphire Pink | 330° | 50% | 15% | | 136 | 112 | 132 | H330L50C15 |
| Dianthus Mauve | 330° | 50% | 20% | | 141 | 109 | 137 | H330L50C20 |
| Crystal Pink | 330° | 50% | 25% | | 145 | 107 | 140 | H330L50C25 |
| Tulipan Violet | 330° | 50% | 30% | | 150 | 105 | 147 | H330L50C30 |
| Violet Red | 330° | 50% | 35% | | 154 | 101 | 150 | H330L50C35 |
| Orchid Purple | 330° | 50% | 40% | | 159 | 97 | 152 | H330L50C40 |
| Greige Violet | 330° | 60% | 10% | | 156 | 140 | 154 | H330L60C10 |
| Vesuvian Violet | 330° | 60% | 15% | | 162 | 138 | 159 | H330L60C15 |
| Gentian Violet | 330° | 60% | 20% | | 168 | 135 | 164 | H330L60C20 |
| Wilhelminian Pink | 330° | 60% | 25% | | 170 | 131 | 164 | H330L60C25 |
| Stage Mauve | 330° | 60% | 30% | | 176 | 129 | 170 | H330L60C30 |
| Cheddar Pink Mauve | 330° | 60% | 35% | | 182 | 125 | 175 | H330L60C35 |
| Colombo Red Mauve | 330° | 60% | 40% | | 186 | 122 | 179 | H330L60C40 |
| Mist Pink | 330° | 70% | 10% | | 184 | 166 | 181 | H330L70C10 |
| Leek Blossom Pink | 330° | 70% | 15% | | 188 | 163 | 184 | H330L70C15 |
| Strawberry Pink | 330° | 70% | 20% | | 193 | 161 | 189 | H330L70C20 |
| Purple Pink | 330° | 70% | 25% | | 202 | 158 | 194 | H330L70C25 |
| Clover Pink | 330° | 70% | 30% | | 205 | 155 | 196 | H330L70C30 |
| Purple White | 330° | 80% | 10% | | 211 | 194 | 207 | H330L80C10 |
| Lovely Pink | 330° | 80% | 15% | | 216 | 191 | 212 | H330L80C15 |
| Designer Pink | 330° | 80% | 20% | | 225 | 188 | 216 | H330L80C20 |
| Light Magnolia Rose | 330° | 85% | 5% | | 219 | 213 | 218 | H330L85C05 |
| Raspberry Pink | 330° | 85% | 10% | | 228 | 211 | 224 | H330L85C10 |
| Heavenly Pink | 330° | 85% | 15% | | 234 | 209 | 228 | H330L85C15 |
| Delicacy White | 330° | 90% | 5% | | 235 | 226 | 229 | H330L90C05 |
| Liquorice Black | 340° | 20% | 5% | | 53 | 45 | 50 | H340L20C05 |
| Mangosteen Violet | 340° | 20% | 10% | | 58 | 39 | 50 | H340L20C10 |
| Sitter Red | 340° | 20% | 15% | | 60 | 34 | 51 | H340L20C15 |
| Juice Violet | 340° | 20% | 20% | | 68 | 34 | 56 | H340L20C20 |
| Prestige Mauve | 340° | 20% | 25% | | 76 | 33 | 61 | H340L20C25 |
| Apple Herb Black | 340° | 30% | 5% | | 75 | 66 | 71 | H340L30C05 |
| Passionfruit Mauve | 340° | 30% | 10% | | 81 | 62 | 73 | H340L30C10 |
| Dark Fig Violet | 340° | 30% | 15% | | 87 | 59 | 76 | H340L30C15 |
| Ruby Violet | 340° | 30% | 20% | | 92 | 56 | 78 | H340L30C20 |
| Blackberry Deep Red | 340° | 30% | 25% | | 99 | 54 | 84 | H340L30C25 |
| Deep Red | 340° | 30% | 30% | | 101 | 48 | 84 | H340L30C30 |
| Velvet Mauve | 340° | 30% | 35% | | 105 | 43 | 87 | H340L30C35 |
| Forest Fruit Red | 340° | 30% | 38% | | 110 | 39 | 89 | H340L30C38 |
| Mauve Brown | 340° | 40% | 5% | | 98 | 89 | 95 | H340L40C05 |
| Spinel Grey | 340° | 40% | 10% | | 106 | 86 | 98 | H340L40C10 |
| Earth Brown Violet | 340° | 40% | 15% | | 112 | 83 | 100 | H340L40C15 |
| Dahlia Matte Red | 340° | 40% | 20% | | 118 | 80 | 103 | H340L40C20 |
| Brocade Violet | 340° | 40% | 25% | | 123 | 77 | 107 | H340L40C25 |
| Madder Magenta | 340° | 40% | 30% | | 128 | 73 | 110 | H340L40C30 |
| Club Mauve | 340° | 40% | 35% | | 131 | 67 | 112 | H340L40C35 |
| Cherry Red | 340° | 40% | 40% | | 136 | 62 | 114 | H340L40C40 |
| Magenta Red | 340° | 40% | 45% | | 145 | 57 | 119 | H340L40C45 |
| Jubilee Grey | 340° | 50% | 5% | | 124 | 115 | 121 | H340L50C05 |
| Port Wine Red | 340° | 50% | 10% | | 133 | 112 | 124 | H340L50C10 |
| Raw Garnet Viola | 340° | 50% | 15% | | 139 | 108 | 126 | H340L50C15 |
| Milkwort Red | 340° | 50% | 20% | | 145 | 105 | 129 | H340L50C20 |
| Rust Magenta | 340° | 50% | 25% | | 150 | 102 | 132 | H340L50C25 |
| Raspberry Jelly Red | 340° | 50% | 30% | | 155 | 98 | 135 | H340L50C30 |
| Thimble Red | 340° | 50% | 35% | | 160 | 93 | 139 | H340L50C35 |
| Cyclamen Red | 340° | 50% | 40% | | 167 | 89 | 141 | H340L50C40 |
| Brilliant Carmine | 340° | 50% | 45% | | 173 | 84 | 143 | H340L50C45 |
| Heather Red Grey | 340° | 60% | 5% | | 152 | 142 | 148 | H340L60C05 |
| Piano Mauve | 340° | 60% | 10% | | 158 | 137 | 150 | H340L60C10 |
| Evening Pink | 340° | 60% | 15% | | 167 | 135 | 154 | H340L60C15 |
| Capri Fashion Pink | 340° | 60% | 20% | | 172 | 131 | 156 | H340L60C20 |
| Antique Hot Pink | 340° | 60% | 25% | | 176 | 127 | 158 | H340L60C25 |
| Cheek Red | 340° | 60% | 30% | | 182 | 124 | 162 | H340L60C30 |
| Hollyhock Blossom Pink | 340° | 60% | 35% | | 189 | 121 | 165 | H340L60C35 |
| Bishop Red | 340° | 60% | 40% | | 196 | 115 | 169 | H340L60C40 |
| Mauve Grey | 340° | 70% | 5% | | 177 | 167 | 173 | H340L70C05 |
| Buckwheat Mauve | 340° | 70% | 10% | | 185 | 164 | 176 | H340L70C10 |
| Hollyhock Pink | 340° | 70% | 15% | | 194 | 161 | 181 | H340L70C15 |
| Idyllic Pink | 340° | 70% | 20% | | 200 | 158 | 183 | H340L70C20 |
| Morning Glory Pink | 340° | 70% | 25% | | 202 | 153 | 183 | H340L70C25 |
| Soft Fuchsia | 340° | 70% | 30% | | 212 | 150 | 189 | H340L70C30 |
| Firm Pink | 340° | 70% | 35% | | 218 | 147 | 193 | H340L70C35 |
| Piano Grey Rose | 340° | 80% | 5% | | 207 | 196 | 199 | H340L80C05 |
| Mint Blossom Rose | 340° | 80% | 10% | | 215 | 194 | 206 | H340L80C10 |
| Scandalous Rose | 340° | 80% | 15% | | 223 | 189 | 208 | H340L80C15 |
| Bonbon Rose | 340° | 80% | 20% | | 230 | 186 | 210 | H340L80C20 |
| Strawberry Cream | 340° | 85% | 5% | | 223 | 212 | 217 | H340L85C05 |
| Light Flamingo Pink | 340° | 85% | 10% | | 231 | 209 | 221 | H340L85C10 |
| Lacquer Mauve | 340° | 85% | 15% | | 240 | 207 | 225 | H340L85C15 |
| Rose White | 340° | 90% | 5% | | 235 | 224 | 228 | H340L90C05 |
| Dress Pink | 340° | 93% | 5% | | 244 | 235 | 239 | H340L93C05 |
| Mulled Wine Red | 350° | 20% | 10% | | 59 | 41 | 50 | H350L20C10 |
| Soft Red | 350° | 20% | 15% | | 65 | 37 | 51 | H350L20C15 |
| Star Ruby | 350° | 20% | 20% | | 72 | 32 | 52 | H350L20C20 |
| Chilli Black Red | 350° | 20% | 25% | | 75 | 28 | 53 | H350L20C25 |
| Tulip Poplar Purple | 350° | 20% | 30% | | 83 | 25 | 56 | H350L20C30 |
| Sparrow Grey Red | 350° | 30% | 10% | | 82 | 62 | 71 | H350L30C10 |
| Siliceous Red | 350° | 30% | 15% | | 90 | 61 | 74 | H350L30C15 |
| Liqueur Red | 350° | 30% | 20% | | 97 | 57 | 75 | H350L30C20 |
| Wine Gummy Red | 350° | 30% | 25% | | 103 | 51 | 76 | H350L30C25 |
| Burlat Red | 350° | 30% | 30% | | 110 | 49 | 79 | H350L30C30 |
| Bordeaux Red | 350° | 30% | 35% | | 111 | 44 | 79 | H350L30C35 |
| Dried Flower Purple | 350° | 30% | 40% | | 117 | 38 | 83 | H350L30C40 |
| Aubergine Grey | 350° | 40% | 10% | | 110 | 88 | 97 | H350L40C10 |
| Opium Mauve | 350° | 40% | 15% | | 115 | 83 | 98 | H350L40C15 |
| Grey Carmine | 350° | 40% | 20% | | 122 | 80 | 99 | H350L40C20 |
| Nectar Red | 350° | 40% | 25% | | 127 | 76 | 100 | H350L40C25 |
| Dark Rose | 350° | 40% | 30% | | 135 | 71 | 102 | H350L40C30 |
| Bonbon Red | 350° | 40% | 35% | | 140 | 66 | 104 | H350L40C35 |
| Cyclamen Red | 350° | 40% | 40% | | 145 | 63 | 106 | H350L40C40 |
| Powder Red | 350° | 40% | 45% | | 149 | 57 | 106 | H350L40C45 |
| Madder Red | 350° | 40% | 50% | | 156 | 50 | 107 | H350L40C50 |
| Innocent Pink | 350° | 50% | 10% | | 133 | 111 | 121 | H350L50C10 |
| Blunt Violet | 350° | 50% | 15% | | 141 | 108 | 122 | H350L50C15 |
| Corundum Red | 350° | 50% | 20% | | 149 | 104 | 125 | H350L50C20 |
| Batik Pink | 350° | 50% | 25% | | 156 | 101 | 126 | H350L50C25 |
| Beryl Red | 350° | 50% | 30% | | 161 | 99 | 129 | H350L50C30 |
| Crimson | 350° | 50% | 35% | | 170 | 92 | 129 | H350L50C35 |
| Madder Rose | 350° | 50% | 40% | | 177 | 88 | 130 | H350L50C40 |
| Signal Pink | 350° | 50% | 45% | | 177 | 83 | 132 | H350L50C45 |
| Nail Polish Pink | 350° | 50% | 50% | | 189 | 78 | 132 | H350L50C50 |
| Art Nouveau Violet | 350° | 60% | 10% | | 160 | 137 | 148 | H350L60C10 |
| Mohair Pink | 350° | 60% | 15% | | 167 | 133 | 148 | H350L60C15 |
| Heather Violet | 350° | 60% | 20% | | 177 | 131 | 152 | H350L60C20 |
| Heather Rose | 350° | 60% | 25% | | 184 | 127 | 151 | H350L60C25 |
| Venetian Pink | 350° | 60% | 30% | | 192 | 123 | 154 | H350L60C30 |
| Dolomite Red | 350° | 60% | 35% | | 197 | 118 | 155 | H350L60C35 |
| Camellia Pink | 350° | 60% | 40% | | 205 | 115 | 157 | H350L60C40 |
| Persian Pink | 350° | 60% | 45% | | 208 | 111 | 160 | H350L60C45 |
| Cold Pink | 350° | 70% | 10% | | 188 | 165 | 173 | H350L70C10 |
| Shady Pink | 350° | 70% | 15% | | 196 | 161 | 175 | H350L70C15 |
| Lady's Cushions Pink | 350° | 70% | 20% | | 201 | 155 | 176 | H350L70C20 |
| Coral Pink | 350° | 70% | 25% | | 212 | 154 | 179 | H350L70C25 |
| Techno Pink | 350° | 70% | 30% | | 221 | 149 | 180 | H350L70C30 |
| Chewing Gum Pink | 350° | 70% | 35% | | 226 | 146 | 182 | H350L70C35 |
| Magnolia White | 350° | 80% | 10% | | 216 | 191 | 200 | H350L80C10 |
| Spring Pink | 350° | 80% | 15% | | 223 | 188 | 201 | H350L80C15 |
| Light Pink | 350° | 80% | 20% | | 232 | 185 | 205 | H350L80C20 |
| Fairy White | 350° | 85% | 5% | | 222 | 212 | 216 | H350L85C05 |
| Orchid Rose | 350° | 85% | 10% | | 233 | 209 | 218 | H350L85C10 |
| Pale Pink | 350° | 85% | 15% | | 239 | 205 | 219 | H350L85C15 |
| Light Rose | 350° | 90% | 5% | | 237 | 224 | 225 | H350L90C05 |
| Ranuncula White | 350° | 90% | 10% | | 245 | 221 | 230 | H350L90C10 |
| Clichy White | 350° | 93% | 5% | | 246 | 235 | 238 | H350L93C05 |
| Piermont Stone Red | 360° | 20% | 15% | | 67 | 35 | 44 | H360L20C15 |
| Russian Red | 360° | 30% | 5% | | 77 | 66 | 68 | H360L30C05 |
| Peppercorn Red | 360° | 30% | 10% | | 83 | 61 | 68 | H360L30C10 |
| Zinfandel Red | 360° | 30% | 15% | | 90 | 56 | 68 | H360L30C15 |
| Art Deco Red | 360° | 30% | 20% | | 98 | 55 | 69 | H360L30C20 |
| Clinker Red | 360° | 30% | 25% | | 102 | 49 | 69 | H360L30C25 |
| Cherry Juice Red | 360° | 30% | 30% | | 108 | 44 | 69 | H360L30C30 |
| Palace Red | 360° | 30% | 35% | | 117 | 39 | 69 | H360L30C35 |
| Ember Red | 360° | 30% | 40% | | 121 | 36 | 69 | H360L30C40 |
| Roasted Black | 360° | 40% | 5% | | 101 | 90 | 92 | H360L40C05 |
| Mocha Brown | 360° | 40% | 10% | | 107 | 86 | 94 | H360L40C10 |
| Ruby Grey | 360° | 40% | 15% | | 115 | 82 | 92 | H360L40C15 |
| Baroque Red | 360° | 40% | 20% | | 123 | 79 | 93 | H360L40C20 |
| Frenzied Red | 360° | 40% | 25% | | 129 | 74 | 92 | H360L40C25 |
| Redcurrant | 360° | 40% | 30% | | 136 | 69 | 94 | H360L40C30 |
| Orient Pink | 360° | 40% | 35% | | 143 | 65 | 95 | H360L40C35 |
| Aurora Magenta | 360° | 40% | 40% | | 150 | 59 | 96 | H360L40C40 |
| Cardinal Red | 360° | 40% | 45% | | 155 | 54 | 94 | H360L40C45 |
| Parlour Red | 360° | 40% | 50% | | 161 | 45 | 93 | H360L40C50 |
| Pumice Grey | 360° | 50% | 5% | | 128 | 115 | 117 | H360L50C05 |
| Pomace Red | 360° | 50% | 10% | | 133 | 111 | 118 | H360L50C10 |
| Evening Crimson | 360° | 50% | 15% | | 142 | 107 | 118 | H360L50C15 |
| Copper Pink | 360° | 50% | 20% | | 148 | 104 | 119 | H360L50C20 |
| Jugendstil Pink | 360° | 50% | 25% | | 157 | 99 | 117 | H360L50C25 |
| Cosmetic Red | 360° | 50% | 30% | | 165 | 96 | 120 | H360L50C30 |
| Indian Pink | 360° | 50% | 35% | | 173 | 91 | 120 | H360L50C35 |
| Kir Royale Rose | 360° | 50% | 40% | | 180 | 88 | 119 | H360L50C40 |
| Cockscomb Red | 360° | 50% | 45% | | 188 | 83 | 120 | H360L50C45 |
| Persian Red | 360° | 50% | 50% | | 192 | 76 | 119 | H360L50C50 |
| Ash Pink | 360° | 60% | 5% | | 153 | 142 | 145 | H360L60C05 |
| Majolica Mauve | 360° | 60% | 10% | | 160 | 137 | 144 | H360L60C10 |
| Fig Fruit Mauve | 360° | 60% | 15% | | 169 | 134 | 145 | H360L60C15 |
| Noble Lilac | 360° | 60% | 20% | | 178 | 131 | 146 | H360L60C20 |
| Light Red | 360° | 60% | 25% | | 184 | 126 | 145 | H360L60C25 |
| Tea Blossom Pink | 360° | 70% | 5% | | 181 | 169 | 172 | H360L70C05 |
| Quartz Pink | 360° | 70% | 10% | | 188 | 163 | 170 | H360L70C10 |
| Opaline Pink | 360° | 70% | 15% | | 198 | 160 | 171 | H360L70C15 |
| Mother-Of-Pearl Pink | 360° | 80% | 5% | | 209 | 196 | 198 | H360L80C05 |
| Venetian Pink | 360° | 80% | 10% | | 217 | 191 | 197 | H360L80C10 |
| Soap Pink | 360° | 80% | 15% | | 229 | 191 | 202 | H360L80C15 |
| Theatre Powder Rose | 360° | 85% | 5% | | 226 | 212 | 212 | H360L85C05 |
| Lotus Pink | 360° | 85% | 10% | | 234 | 208 | 214 | H360L85C10 |
| Ice Pink | 360° | 90% | 5% | | 241 | 225 | 224 | H360L90C05 |
| Cake Frosting | 360° | 90% | 10% | | 249 | 223 | 229 | H360L90C10 |
| Arrowhead White | 360° | 93% | 5% | | 249 | 234 | 235 | H360L93C05 |
