= Civil aviation authority =

Government agency charged with the regulation of aviation

A civil aviation authority (CAA) is a national or supranational statutory body that oversees the regulation of civil aviation, including the maintenance of an aircraft register.

== Role ==
Due to the inherent dangers in the use of flight vehicles, national aviation authorities typically regulate the following critical aspects of aircraft airworthiness and their operation:

- design of aircraft, engines, airborne equipment and ground-based equipment affecting flight safety
- conditions of manufacture and testing of aircraft and equipment
- maintenance of aircraft and equipment
- operation of aircraft and equipment
- licensing of pilots, air traffic controllers, flight dispatchers and maintenance engineers
- licensing of airports and navigational aids
- standards for air traffic control.

Depending on the legal system of the jurisdiction, a CAA will derive its powers from an act of parliament (such as the Civil or Federal Aviation Act), and is then empowered to make regulations within the bounds of the act. This allows technical aspects of airworthiness to be dealt with by subject matter experts and not politicians.

A CAA may also be involved in the investigation of aircraft accidents, although in many cases this is left to a separate body (such as the Australian Transport Safety Bureau (ATSB) in Australia or the National Transportation Safety Board (NTSB) in the United States), to allow independent review of regulatory oversight.

A CAA will regulate the control of air traffic but a separate agency will generally carry out air traffic control functions.

In some countries a CAA may build and operate airports, including non-airside operations such as passenger terminals; the Civil Aviation Authority of Nepal and the Civil Aviation Authority of the Philippines being among such authorities. In other countries, private companies or local government authorities may own and operate individual airports.

Civil aviation authorities do not regulate military aviation. Military aviation will typically have a completely separate personnel licensing system. In the United Kingdom, military aviation is regulated by the Military Aviation Authority.

The International Civil Aviation Organization (ICAO) refers to civil aviation authorities as National Airworthiness Authorities (NAA), particularly when referring to an authority in its capacity as an airworthiness authority; or sometimes as National Aviation Authorities (also NAA). EASA refers to them as National Aviation Authorities.

== History ==
The independent development of CAAs resulted in differing regulations from country to country. This required aircraft manufacturers in the past to develop different models for specific national requirements (such as the BAe Jetstream 31), and impeded airline travel into foreign jurisdictions. The Convention on International Civil Aviation (Chicago Convention) was signed in 1944 and addressed these issues. This then led to the establishment by the United Nations of the International Civil Aviation Organization (ICAO) in 1947 which now oversees member states, and works to implement regulatory changes to ensure that best practice regulations are adopted.

The Joint Aviation Authorities (JAA) was founded in 1970, for cooperation between European CAAs. It published the Joint Aviation Requirements (JAR), to create minimum standards across agencies. It was replaced by the European Aviation Safety Agency and disbanded in 2009.

The European Aviation Safety Agency (EASA) was created in 2003 as an agency of the European Union, replacing the Joint Aviation Authorities. It standardises aviation regulations across the European Union and the European Free Trade Association. Member states continue to have their own agencies, which implement EASA rules. EASA has working relationships with non-member states including Armenia, Georgia, Moldova and Ukraine. It was renamed the European Union Aviation Safety Agency in 2018.

== List of civil aviation authorities ==
This is a list of national and supra-national civil aviation authorities.

Country	Authority name in English	Authority name in local language(s) (If the local language is not English)	Website
United Nations	International Civil Aviation Organization	Organisation de l'aviation civile internationale; Organización de Aviación Civil Internacional; Международная организация гражданской авиации; 国际民用航空组织	www.icao.int
Afghanistan	Ministry of Transport and Civil Aviation	د افغانستان اسلامی جمهوریت، د ترانسپورت او ملکي هوايي چلند وزارت	www.motca.gov.af
Albania	Albanian Civil Aviation Authority	Autoriteti i Aviacionit Civil të Shqipërisë	www.aac.gov.al
Algeria	Directorate of Civil Aviation and Meteorology	Établissement de Gestion de Services Aéroportuaires d'Alger (EGSA), Établissement Nationale de la Navigation Aérienne (ENNA)	www.egsa-alger.dz www.enna.dz
Angola	National Civil Aviation Authority of Angola	Autoridade Nacional da Aviação Civil (ANAC)	www.anac.ao/ao/
Argentina	National Civil Aviation Administration	Administración Nacional de Aviación Civil	www.anac.gov.ar
Armenia	General Department of Civil Aviation of Armenia	Քաղաքացիական Ավիացիայի Գլխավոր Վարչություն	www.aviation.am
Aruba	Department of Civil Aviation of Aruba		www.dca.gov.aw
Australia	Civil Aviation Safety Authority		www.casa.gov.au
Austria	Supreme Civil Aviation Authority	Oberste Zivilluftfahrtbehörde	www.bmimi.gv.at/themen/verkehr/luftfahrt/behoerden/ozb
Azerbaijan	State Civil Aviation Agency of Azerbaijan	Azərbaycan Respublikasının Dövlət Mülki Aviasiya Agentliyi	www.caa.gov.az
Bahamas	Department of Civil Aviation of Bahamas		www.bahamas.gov.bs
Bahrain	Department of Civil Aviation Affairs	شئون الطيران المدني	www.caa.gov.bh
Bangladesh	Civil Aviation Authority of Bangladesh	বেসামরিক বিমান চলাচল কর্তৃপক্ষ	www.caab.gov.bd
Barbados	Civil Aviation Department of Barbados		bcad.gov.bb
Belarus	Aviation Department of Belarus	Департамент по авиации	www.avia.by
Belgium	Federal Public Service Mobility and Transport	Service public fédéral Mobilité et Transports; Federale overheidsdienst Mobiliteit en Vervoer	mobilit.belgium.be/fr/transport_aerien%20mobilit.belgium.be/fr/ - French mobilit.belgium.be/nl/luchtvaart%20mobilit.belgium.be/nl/ - Dutch
Benin	National Civil Aviation Agency	Agence Nationale de l'Aviation Civile du Bénin	www.anac.bj
Bermuda	Bermuda Civil Aviation Authority		www.bcaa.bm
Bhutan	Bhutan Civil Aviation Authority		www.bcaa.gov.bt
Bolivia	Directorate General of Civil Aeronautics	Dirección General de Aeronáutica Civil	www.dgac.gob.bo
Bosnia and Herzegovina	Bosnia and Herzegovina Directorate of Civil Aviation	Bosna i Hercegovina Direkcija za civilno zrakoplovstvo	www.bhdca.gov.ba/eng/
Botswana	Civil Aviation Authority of Botswana		www.caab.co.bw
Brazil	National Civil Aviation Agency of Brazil	Agência Nacional de Aviação Civil (ANAC)	www.anac.gov.br
Brunei	Department of Civil Aviation of Brunei	Jabatan Penerbangan Awam	www.dca.gov.bn
Bulgaria	Civil Aviation Administration (Bulgaria)	Главна дирекция "Гражданска въздухоплавателна администрация	www.caa.bg
Cambodia	Secretariat of State for Civil Aviation	រដ្ឋលេខាធិការដ្ឋានអាកាសចរស៊ីវិល	www.civilaviation.gov.kh
Cameroon	Cameroon Civil Aviation Authority		www.ccaa.aero
Canada	Transport Canada Civil Aviation Directorate (Transport Canada Civil Aviation)	Transports Canada Direction générale de l'aviation civile	www.tc.gc.ca/eng/civilaviation/menu.htm - English www.tc.gc.ca/fra/civilaviation/menu.htm - French
Cayman Islands	Civil Aviation Authority of the Cayman Islands		www.caacayman.com
Chile	Directorate General of Civil Aviation	Dirección General de Aeronáutica Civil	www.dgac.gob.cl
China	Civil Aviation Administration of China	中国民用航空局	www.caac.gov.cn
Colombia	Special Administrative Unit of Civil Aeronautics	Unidad Administrativa Especial de Aeronáutica Civil	www.aerocivil.gov.co
Cook Islands	Pacific Aviation Safety Office		www.paso.aero
Costa Rica	Directorate General of Civil Aviation of Costa Rica	Dirección General de Aviación Civil de Costa Rica	www.dgac.go.cr
Croatia	Croatian Civil Aviation Agency	Hrvatska agencija za civilno zrakoplovstvo	www.ccaa.hr
Cuba	Institute of Civil Aeronautics of Cuba	Instituto de Aeronáutica Civil de Cuba	www.cubagob.cu
Cyprus	Department of Civil Aviation of Cyprus	Τμήμα Πολιτικής Αεροπορίας	www.mcw.gov.cy/mcw/dca/dca.nsf/DMLindex_en/DMLindex_en?OpenDocument
Czech Republic	Civil Aviation Authority of the Czech Republic	Úřad pro civilní letectví Česká republika	www.caa.cz/en/index.php
Denmark	Danish Transport Authority	Trafikstyrelsen	www.trafikstyrelsen.dk
Dominican Republic	Dominican Institute of Civil Aviation	Instituto Dominicano de Aviación Civil	www.idac.gov.do
Ecuador	Directorate General of Civil Aviation of Ecuador	Dirección General de Aviación Civil	www.aviacioncivil.gob.ec
Egypt	Ministry of Civil Aviation of Egypt	وزارة الطيران المدني	www.civilaviation.gov.eg
El Salvador	Civil Aviation Authority of El Salvador	Autoridad de Aviación Civil	www.aac.gob.sv
Estonia	Estonian Civil Aviation Administration	Lennuamet	www.transpordiamet.ee
Eswatini	Eswatini Civil Aviation Authority		www.eswacaa.co.sz
Ethiopia	Ethiopian Civil Aviation Authority	የኢትዮጵያ ሲቪል ኤቪዬሽን ባለሥልጣን	www.ecaa.gov.et
European Union	European Aviation Safety Agency		easa.europa.eu
Fiji	Civil Aviation Authority of Fiji		www.caafi.org.fj
Finland	Finnish Transport and Communications Agency	Liikenne- ja viestintävirasto Transport- och kommunikationsverket	www.traficom.fi
France	Directorate General for Civil Aviation	Direction Générale de l'Aviation Civile	www.dgac.fr
Gabon	National Civil Aviation Agency	Agence Nationale de l'Aviation Civile (ANAC)	www.anacgabon.org
Gambia	Gambia Civil Aviation Authority		www.gambia.gm/gcaa/
Georgia	Georgian Civil Aviation Administration	საქართველოს სამოქალაქო ავიაციის სააგენტო	gcaa.ge/en/
Germany	Federal Aviation Office	Luftfahrt-Bundesamt (LBA)	www.lba.de/EN/
Ghana	Ghana Civil Aviation Authority		www.gcaa.com.gh
Greece	Hellenic Civil Aviation Authority	Υπηρεσία Πολιτικής Αεροπορίας (ΥΠΑ)	www.hcaa.gr
Guatemala	Directorate General of Civil Aviation of Guatemala	Dirección General de Aeronáutica Civil	https://www.dgac.gob.gt/
Guernsey and Jersey	Office of the Director of Civil Aviation		cidca.aero
Guyana	Guyana Civil Aviation Authority		www.gcaa-gy.org
Hong Kong	Civil Aviation Department	民航處	www.cad.gov.hk
Hungary	Ministry of Construction and Transport	Építési és Közlekedési Minisztérium	www.kozlekedesihatosag.kormany.hu/hu/web/legugyi-szakterulet
Iceland	Icelandic Transport Authority	Samgöngustofa	www.icetra.is
India	Directorate General of Civil Aviation		dgca.gov.in
Indonesia	Directorate General of Civil Aviation	Direktorat Jenderal Perhubungan Udara	hubud.dephub.go.id
Iran	Iran Civil Aviation Organization	سازمان هواپیمایی كشوری	en.caa.gov.ir
Iraq	Iraqi Civil Aviation Authority	سلطة الطيران المدني العراقي	www.icaa.gov.iq
Ireland	Irish Aviation Authority	Údarás Eitlíochta na hÉireann	www.iaa.ie
Israel	Civil Aviation Authority	רשות התעופה האזרחית	caa.gov.il
Isle of Man	Isle of Man Aircraft Registry		www.gov.im/ded/aircraft/
Italy	National Agency for Civil Aviation	Ente nazionale per l'aviazione civile	https://www.enac.gov.it/Home/
Jamaica	Jamaica Civil Aviation Authority		www.jcaa.gov.jm
Japan	Japan Civil Aviation Bureau	航空局	www.mlit.go.jp/en/koku/index.html
Jordan	Civil Aviation Regulatory Commission of Jordan		www.carc.jo
Kazakhstan	Civil Aviation Committee	Азаматтық авиация комитеті	aviation.mid.gov.kz/en
Kenya	Kenya Civil Aviation Authority		www.kcaa.or.ke
Democratic People's Republic of Korea	Civil Aviation Administration of Korea	조선민용항공총국	
South Korea	Korea Office of Civil Aviation	대한민국 국토교통부 항공정책실	koca.go.kr
Kiribati	Pacific Aviation Safety Office		www.paso.aero
Kosovo	Civil Aviation Authority of Kosovo	Autoriteti i Aviacionit Civil të Kosovës	www.caa-ks.org
Kuwait	Directorate General of Civil Aviation	الإدارة العامة للطيران المدني	www.dgca.gov.kw
Kyrgyzstan	Civil Aviation Agency of Kyrgyz Republic	Агентство Гражданской Авиации Кыргызской Республики	www.caa.kg
Laos	Department of Civil Aviation of Laos	ກົມການບິນພົນລະເຮືອນແຫ່ງ ສປປ ລາວ	www.dcal.gov.la
Latvia	Civil Aviation Agency of Latvia	Civilās aviācijas aģentūra	www.caa.lv
Lebanon	Lebanese Civil Aviation Authority	مصلحة الطيران المدني اللبناني	www.dgca.gov.lb
Lesotho	Department of Civil Aviation of Lesotho		www.civilair.gov.ls
Libya	Libyan Civil Aviation Authority	مصلحة الطيران المدني	www.lycaa.org
Liechtenstein	Office of Civil Aviation of Liechtenstein		
Lithuania	Transport Competence Agency	Transporto Kompetencijų Agentūra	tka.lt
Luxembourg	Directorate of Civil Aviation of Luxembourg	Direction de l'Aviation Civile	www.dac.public.lu
Macau	Civil Aviation Authority	民航局; Autoridade de Aviação Civil	www.aacm.gov.mo/english/comm/e-comm-index.html
Malaysia	Civil Aviation Authority of Malaysia	Pihak Berkuasa Penerbangan Awam Malaysia	www.caam.gov.my
Malawi	Department of Civil Aviation of Malawi		www.malawi.gov.mw/Transport/Home%20CivilAviation.htm
Maldives	Civil Aviation Department of the Maldives		www.aviainfo.gov.mv
Malta	Civil Aviation Directorate of Malta	Direttorat tal-Avjazzjoni Ċivili	www.transport.gov.mt/aviation/civil-aviation-directorate
Marshall Islands	Directorate of Civil Aviation of the Marshall Islands		rmipa.com/airports/
Mauritius	Department of Civil Aviation of Mauritius		civil-aviation.govmu.org
Mexico	Federal Civil Aviation Agency	Agencia Federal de Aviación Civil	www.gob.mx/afac/en
Moldova	Civil Aviation Administration of Moldova	Autoritatea Aeronautică Civilă a Republicii Moldova	en.caa.md
Mongolia	Civil Aviation Authority of Mongolia	Иргэний Нисэхийн Ерөнхий Газар	www.mcaa.gov.mn?page_id=6161
Monaco	Monaco Civil Aviation Authority	Service de l'Aviation Civile du Principauté de Monaco	en.gouv.mc/Government-Institutions/The-Government/Ministry-of-Public-Works-the-Environment-and-Urban-Development/Civil-Aviation-Authority
Montenegro	Civil Aviation Agency of Montenegro	Agencija za civilno vazduhoplovstvo	www.caa.me
Morocco	Directorate General of Civil Aviation	Direction Générale de l'Aviation Civile	www.aviationcivile.gov.ma www.transport.gov.ma/fr/secteurs/aviation-civile
Mozambique	Civil Aviation Institute of Mozambique	Instituto de Aviação Civil de Moçambique	www.iacm.gov.mz
Myanmar	Department of Civil Aviation	ေလေၾကာင္းပို႔ေဆာင္ေရးၫႊန္ၾကားမႈဦးစီးဌာန	www.mot.gov.mm/dca/
Namibia	Namibia Civil Aviation Authority		www.dca.com.na
Nauru	Pacific Aviation Safety Office		www.paso.aero
Nepal	Civil Aviation Authority of Nepal	नेपाल नागरिक उड्डयन प्राधिकरण	caanepal.gov.np
Netherlands	Human Environment and Transport Inspectorate	Inspectie Leefomgeving en Transport (ILT)	english.ilent.nl/themes/themes/aviation
New Zealand	Civil Aviation Authority of New Zealand		www.caa.govt.nz
Nicaragua	Nicaraguan Institute of Civil Aviation	Instituto Nicaragüense de Aeronáutica Civil	www.inac.gob.ni
Nigeria	Nigerian Civil Aviation Authority		www.ncaa.gov.ng
Niue	Pacific Aviation Safety Office		www.paso.aero
North Macedonia	Civil Aviation Agency of North Macedonia	Агенција за цивилно воздухопловство	www.caa.gov.mk
Norway	Civil Aviation Authority of Norway	Luftfartstilsynet	luftfartstilsynet.no/caa_no/
Oman	Civil Aviation Authority- Sultanate of Oman	هیئه الطیران المدنی-سلطنة عمان	www.caa.gov.om
Pakistan	Pakistan Civil Aviation Authority	مقتدرۂ شہری طیران پاکستان	www.caapakistan.com.pk
Panama	Civil Aviation Authority of Panama	Autoridad Aeronáutica Civil	www.aeronautica.gob.pa
Papua New Guinea	Civil Aviation Authority of Papua New Guinea; Pacific Aviation Safety Office		www.casapng.gov.pg www.paso.aero
Paraguay	Directorate National of Civil Aeronautics	Dirección Nacional de Aeronáutica Civil	www.dinac.gov.py
Peru	Directorate General of Civil Aviation of Peru	Dirección General de Aeronáutica Civil	portal.mtc.gob.pe/page_english/front-end/civilaviation/index.html
Philippines	Civil Aviation Authority of the Philippines	Pangasiwaan sa Abyasyong Sibil ng Pilipinas	www.caap.gov.ph
Poland	Civil Aviation Authority	Urząd Lotnictwa Cywilnego	www.ulc.gov.pl
Portugal	National Authority of Civil Aviation of Portugal	Autoridade Nacional de Aviação Civil (ANAC)	www.anac.pt
Qatar	Civil Aviation Authority of Qatar	للهيئة العامة للطيران المدني	www.caa.gov.qa
Romania	Romanian Civil Aeronautical Authority	Autoritatea Aeronautică Civilă Română	www.caa.ro
Russia	Federal Air Transport Agency	Федеральное агентство воздушного транспорта	www.favt.ru
Rwanda	Rwanda Civil Aviation Authority		www.caa.gov.rw
Samoa	Pacific Aviation Safety Office		www.paso.aero
San Marino	San Marino Civil Aviation and Maritime Authority	Autorità per l'Aviazione Civile e la Navigazione Marittima	www.caa-mna.sm
Saudi Arabia	General Authority of Civil Aviation	الهيئة العامة للطيران المدني	gaca.gov.sa/en/
Senegal	National Civil Aviation Agency of Senegal	Agence Nationale de l'Aviation Civile du Sénégal	www.anacim.sn
Serbia	Civil Aviation Directorate	Директорат Цивилног Ваздухопловства	www.cad.gov.rs
Seychelles	Seychelles Civil Aviation Authority		www.scaa.sc
Singapore	Civil Aviation Authority of Singapore	Penguasa Penerbangan Awam Singapura	www.caas.gov.sg
Slovakia	Civil Aviation Authority of the Slovak Republic	Letecký úrad Slovenskej republiky	www.caa.sk
Slovenia	Civil Aviation Authority of the Slovenian Republic	Javna agencija za civilno letalstvo Republike Slovenije	www.caa.si
Solomon Islands	Pacific Aviation Safety Office		www.paso.aero
Somalia	Somali Civil Aviation and Meteorology Authority	Hay'adda Duulista Rayidka & Saadaasha Hawada Soomaaliyeed	www.scama.so
South Africa	South African Civil Aviation Authority		www.caa.co.za
Spain	Spanish Aviation Safety and Security Agency	Agencia Estatal de Seguridad Aérea (AESA)	www.seguridadaerea.gob.es/en
Sri Lanka	Civil Aviation Authority of Sri Lanka	ශ්‌රී ලංකා සිවිල් ගුවන් සේවා අධිකාරිය	www.caa.lk
Sudan	Civil Aviation Authority of Sudan	الهيئة العامة للطيران المدني	www.caa-sudan.net
Suriname	Civil Aviation Department of Suriname	Luchtvaartdienst Suriname	www.cadsur.sr
Sweden	Swedish Transport Agency	Transportstyrelsen	www.transportstyrelsen.se/en/aviation/
Switzerland	Federal Office for Civil Aviation	Office fédéral de l'aviation civile (OFAC); Bundesamt für Zivilluftfahrt (BAZL); Ufficio federale dell'aviazione civile (UFAC); Uffizi federal d'aviatica civila	www.bazl.admin.ch/index.html?lang=en
Syria	General Authority of Civil Aviation	الهيئة العامة للطيران المدني	gaca-sy.com
Taiwan	Civil Aeronautics Administration	交通部民用航空局	www.caa.gov.tw
Tanzania	Tanzania Civil Aviation Authority	Mamlaka ya Usafiri wa Anga Tanzania	www.tcaa.go.tz
Thailand	The Civil Aviation Authority of Thailand	สำนักงานการบินพลเรือนแห่งประเทศไทย	www.caat.or.th
Timor-Leste	Civil Aviation Division of Timor-Leste	Divisão de Aviação Civil de Timor-Leste	gov.east-timor.org/CAA/
Togo	Civil Aviation Agency of Togo	Agence Nationale de l'Aviation Civile du Togo (ANAC-TOGO)	www.anac-togo.tg
Tonga	Pacific Aviation Safety Office		www.paso.aero
Trinidad and Tobago	Trinidad and Tobago Civil Aviation Authority		www.caa.gov.tt
Tunisia	Office of Civil Aviation and Airports	Office de l'aviation civile et des aéroports ديوان الطيران المدني والمطارات	www.oaca.nat.tn/index_eng.htm
Turkey	Directorate General of Civil Aviation of Turkey	Sivil Havacılık Genel Müdürlüğü	web.shgm.gov.tr
Turks and Caicos Islands	Turks and Caicos Islands Civil Aviation Authority		tcicaa.org
Tuvalu	Pacific Aviation Safety Office		www.paso.aero
Uganda	Civil Aviation Authority of Uganda	Ekitongole kya Uganda ekikola ku by'ennyonyi	caa.go.ug
Ukraine	State Aviation Administration of Ukraine	Державна авіаційна служба України (Державіаслужба)	www.avia.gov.ua
United Arab Emirates	General Civil Aviation Authority	هيئة الطيران المدني	www.gcaa.ae
United Kingdom	Civil Aviation Authority		www.caa.co.uk
United States	Federal Aviation Administration		www.faa.gov
Uruguay	National Civil Aviation and Aviation Infrastructure Direction	Dirección Nacional de Aviación Civil e Infraestructura Aeronáutica	www.dinacia.gub.uy
Vanuatu	Pacific Aviation Safety Office		www.paso.aero
Venezuela	National Institute of Civil Aviation	Instituto Nacional de Aviación Civil	www.inac.gov.ve
Vietnam	Civil Aviation Administration of Vietnam	Cục Hàng không Việt Nam	www.caa.gov.vn
Yemen	Civil Aviation and Meteorological Authority of Yemen	الهيئة العامة للطيران المدني و الأرصاد	www.cama.gov.ye
Zambia	Department of Civil Aviation		www.dca.com.zm
Zimbabwe	Civil Aviation Authority of Zimbabwe		www.caaz.co.zw

== See also ==
- Air route authority between the United States and China
- Federal Aviation Regulations
