= BCAA =

BCAA may refer to:

- Branched-chain amino acid
- Belgian Civil Aviation Authority
- Bermuda Civil Aviation Authority
- British Columbia Automobile Association
