= Office of the Director of Civil Aviation =

Civil Aviation Authority of Bailiwick of Guernsey and Jersey

The Office of the Director of Civil Aviation (ODCA) is the civil aviation authority of the Bailiwick of Guernsey and Bailiwick of Jersey. It is run by the Director of Civil Aviation.

The Director of Civil Aviation regulates civil aviation in Guernsey and Jersey, and the Channel Islands Control Zone. It regulates aerodromes, airspace, air traffic controllers and air transport services, and operates meteorological services.

== History ==
The authority was created in 2008 by the Aviation (Bailiwick of Guernsey) Law and the Civil Aviation (Jersey) Law.

Jersey and Guernsey have their own separate aviation legislation, however, Standardised European Rules of the Air (SERA) came into force in 2017.

The Director is employed separately by both countries to preserve their independence. There are technically two positions: the Director of Civil Aviation for the Bailiwick of Jersey, and the Director of Civil Aviation for the Bailiwick of Guernsey. However, both positions are held by the same person. In 2020, the then director was removed from his job for gross incompetence.
