= Flight 73 =

Flight 73 may refer to:

- Pan Am Flight 73, hijacked on 5 September 1986
- Global Aviation Flight 73, crashed on 28 November 2004
- Air Niugini Flight 73, crashed on 28 September 2018
