= Pacific Aviation Safety Office =

Intergovernmental civil aviation authority

The Pacific Aviation Safety Office (PASO) is an intergovernmental civil aviation authority that is responsible for aviation safety and security in ten states of Oceania. PASO is headquartered in Anchor House on Kumul Highway in Port Vila, Vanuatu.

PASO was informally organised in 2002 by the aviation ministers of several states of the Pacific Islands Forum. The organisation was formally confirmed through the conclusion of the Pacific Islands Civil Aviation Safety and Security Treaty, which was signed on 9 August 2004 in Apia, Samoa. The treaty entered into force on 11 June 2005 and has been ratified by the Cook Islands, Kiribati, Nauru, Niue, Papua New Guinea, Samoa, Solomon Islands, Tonga, Tuvalu, and Vanuatu. The Pacific Islands Forum states that have not ratified the treaty and joined PASO are Australia, Fiji, Marshall Islands, Micronesia, and New Zealand.

Tonga withdrew from PASO on 7 April 2006, but joined again on 24 August 2006.

PASO works closely with the Australian Civil Aviation Safety Authority, the Civil Aviation Authority of Fiji, and the Civil Aviation Authority of New Zealand.

== See also ==
- Papua New Guinea Accident Investigation Commission
