= Vehicle registration plates of Belgium =

België/Belgique/Belgien
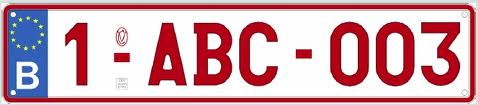
- Current regular legal standard number plate from Belgium.
- Country: Belgium
- Country code: B

Current series
- Size: 520 mm × 110 mm 20.5 in × 4.3 in
- Serial format: 1-AAA-345 (for standard plates)
- Colour (front): Red on white
- Colour (rear): Red on white

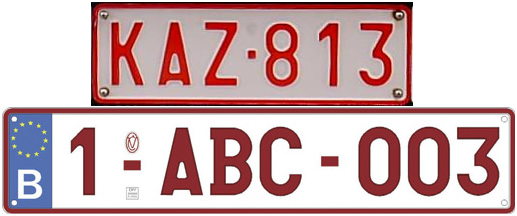
Standard Belgian vehicle registration plates - the format on top -(still in legal use) was issued from 1973 to 2008 (from 2008 to 2010 with the letter and number combinations reversed), whilst the one on the bottom is the current one introduced in 2010. Registration plates issues after January 2021 begin with a 2 as opposed to a 1

Vehicle registration plates in Belgium are driver specific, meaning that they are transferred to a new vehicle from the owner's previous one. Because of this, scratched, dirty, or old registration plates may be sometimes affixed onto new cars in Belgium.

The rear registration plate is state-supplied, while the front plate is owner-supplied. This means that front plates can vary in material. Regulations for the older front plates were previously much less strict, they could differ from the standardized rear plates in size, letter colouring and design, however such customization is no longer permitted with the current series.

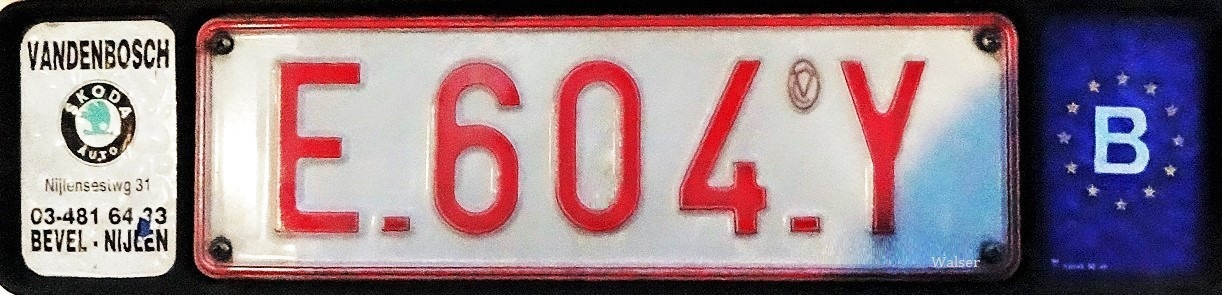
An example of a Belgian registration plate from 1971 to 1973. Due to their size not fitting with the 520 by 110 mm European standard, pre-2010 rear plates could be seen mounted on a base plate which usually displays the letter "B" and an advertisement for the car dealer.

The responsible government agency is the Vehicle Registration Service (DIV) of the Federal Public Service Mobility and Transport.

== Types ==
=== Standard ===
Registration plates normally accompany owners rather than cars: this means that when an owner replaces their car they transfer the old plate to their new car, while the new owner of the old car will need to associate to it their own existing plate, if they have one, or otherwise apply for a new plate. For this reason, although it is quite simple to determine when a given number combination was issued, the number used will give no reliable information about the original registration year of the car to which it is fixed.

Standard registration plates have a white background with red numbers and letters. Plates issued before November 2010 measured 325 by 105mm - smaller than most other European countries (which use the plate size 520 by 110mm), although the non-standard 520 by 110mm size was frequently used for the front plate - in part due to influence from the rest of Europe and in part due to plates often carrying additional information such as the Euro flag. In November 2010 Belgium introduced the standard European format as one of the last EU member states to do so. This delay was caused in part by opposition to abandoning the distinctive colour scheme (red characters on white background) in favour of the European standard, which dictates black characters on either a white or a yellow background. In the end it was decided to preserve the red-on-white colour although a darker shade of red (ruby red - RAL 3003) is used.

The combination on the plate does not give any information about the geographical location.

Sometimes the first letter (or first and second letter) has a special meaning:

- CD: Diplomats (CD stands for 'Corps Diplomatique')
- G: Agricultural vehicles
- M or W: Motorcycles
- O: Can be used on vintage vehicles which are more than 25 years old ("Oldtimers"). Since July 2013 a few restrictions were lifted. It is now allowed to drive the vehicle at night or at more than 25 km from the home of the owner. The vehicle may not be used for commercial purposes or driving between home and work.
- S: Scooters
- T or TX: Taxis ("T" is used as initial letter, "TX" when preceded by a number)
- U or Q: Trailer Plates
- Z: Dealer Plate
- ZZ: Test Drive Vehicle

For the remaining letters, all letters of the alphabet are used. Initially the letters I, M, Q and W were never used as the 2nd or 3rd letter, but they were added later to extend the number of available combinations. The letter "O" was not used as the 2nd/3rd letter on the six-character plates; on the seven-character plates it is used however.

=== Diplomats ===
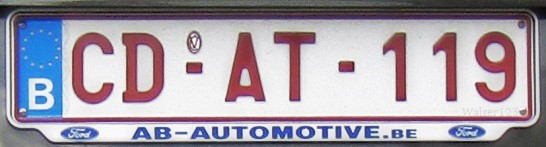
2010 Diplomatic registration plate

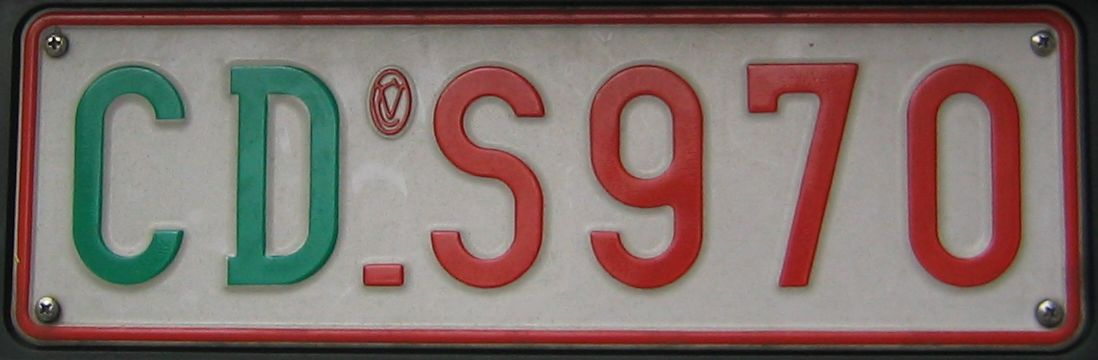
Old license plate for embassy staff

The initial letters (CD - Corps Diplomatique) are printed in green or red, followed by a dot "." and 4 symbols (5 symbols in 2010) printed in red. By chronological order of registration, these symbols can be:

- 4 digits
- 1 letter + 3 digits
- 3 digits + 1 letter (observed in 2008)
- 2 letter + 3 digits (2010)

=== Court and royal household ===
Plate belonging to the Royal family

Plates issued to vehicles of the Royal Court bear numbers only, following the standard colour scheme. Cars used by the king and queen have single-digit numbers only (1 to 9). Cars used by other members of the royal family have two digits.

=== Officials ===
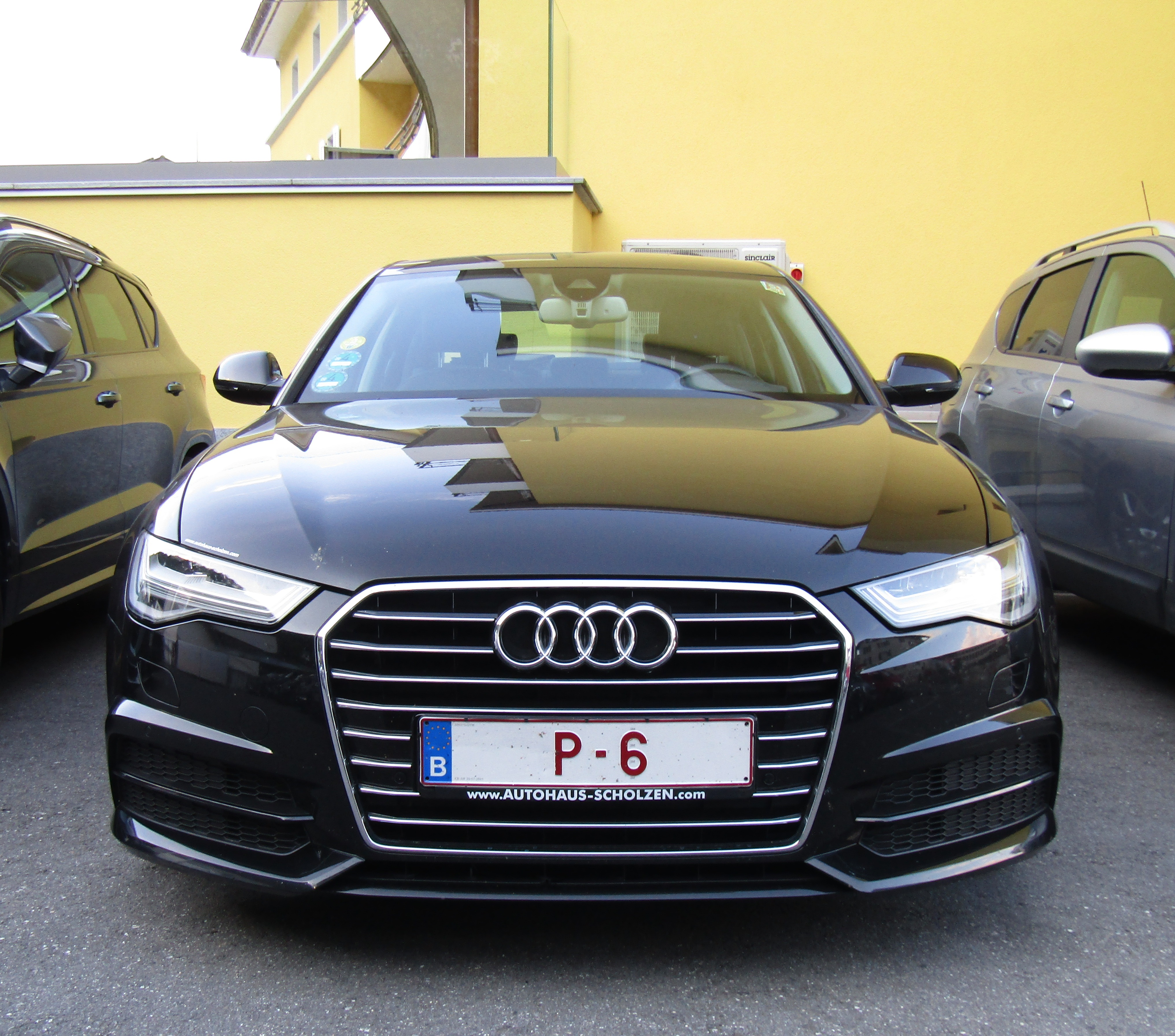
P-6, Parliament registration plate

Plates issued to state officials consist of a single letter followed by one to three numbers. Roughly speaking, the initial letter is either "A" for Ministers (excluding regional executives) and Ministers of State (an honorific title for distinguished politicians), or "P" for members of Parliament (including regional parliaments), or "E" for members and services of the regional governments. The president of the Belgian Chamber of Representatives has registration plate "A1" (1st citizen of the Kingdom), the president of the Belgian Senate has "A2", the prime minister has "A3", and so on.

=== Military ===
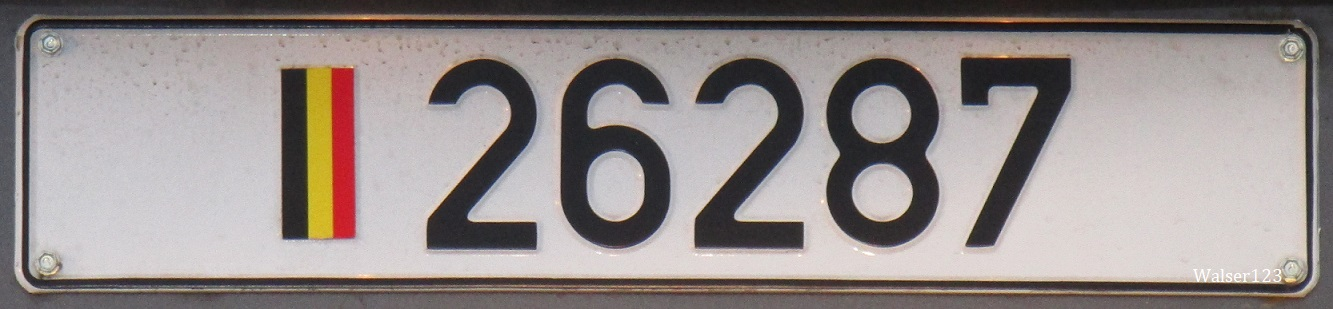
Belgian military number plate, 2019

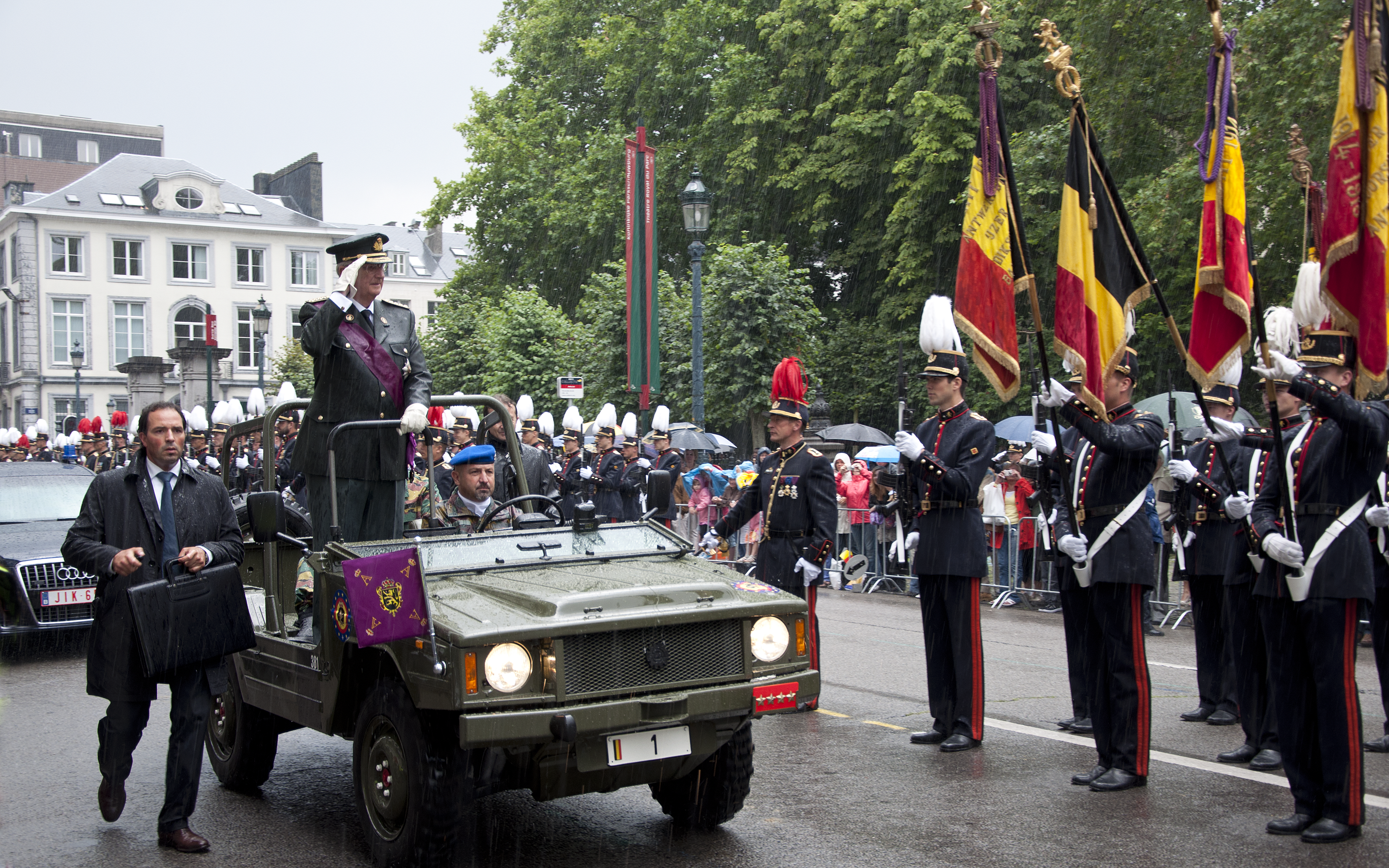
Belgian military number plate, in this case Nr 1 for the King

Vehicles of the Belgian Land Component use white plates with black numbers and a Belgian flag on the left.

The NATO Headquarters formerly used a red plate with the white letters SB (later M) followed by a number.

=== Registration plates for trailers and caravans ===
These plates are issued in a separate series for trailers and caravans weighing over 750 kg.

An earlier trailer plate design consisted of a combination of three letters, starting with "U", and three digits, all red on a white reflecting background and within a red frame (thus the only difference from ordinary plates was the use of "U" as the first letter). (Dimensions: 340 mm x 110 mm). Plates of this design are no longer delivered, but are still valid.

As from 2002 the new European model was introduced, consisting of a combination of 3 letters and 3 digits of black colour on white reflecting background with black frame. This plate always starts with the letter "Q". On the left of the plate a blue banner of 44 mm width has been added with on top a circle with 12 yellow stars and below a white character " B". These will replace gradually the old model. Dimensions: 521 mm x 110 mm

These plates are never delivered to regular vehicles.

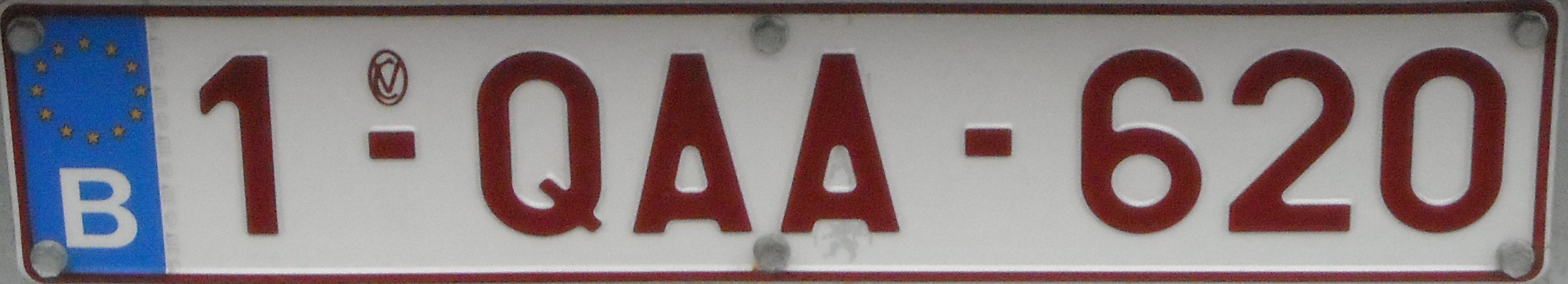
Post 2010 trailer plate

Design further evolved after 2010 and the introduction of new 7 character plates. Trailer plates switched to the RAL-3001 colour, still starting with the letter Q (1-QAA-123).

This design was short lived, as they were soon replaced by plates using Q as indicative numbers instead (Q-ABC-123). These are the currently issued trailer plates design.

=== Plates for personnel of international bodies ===
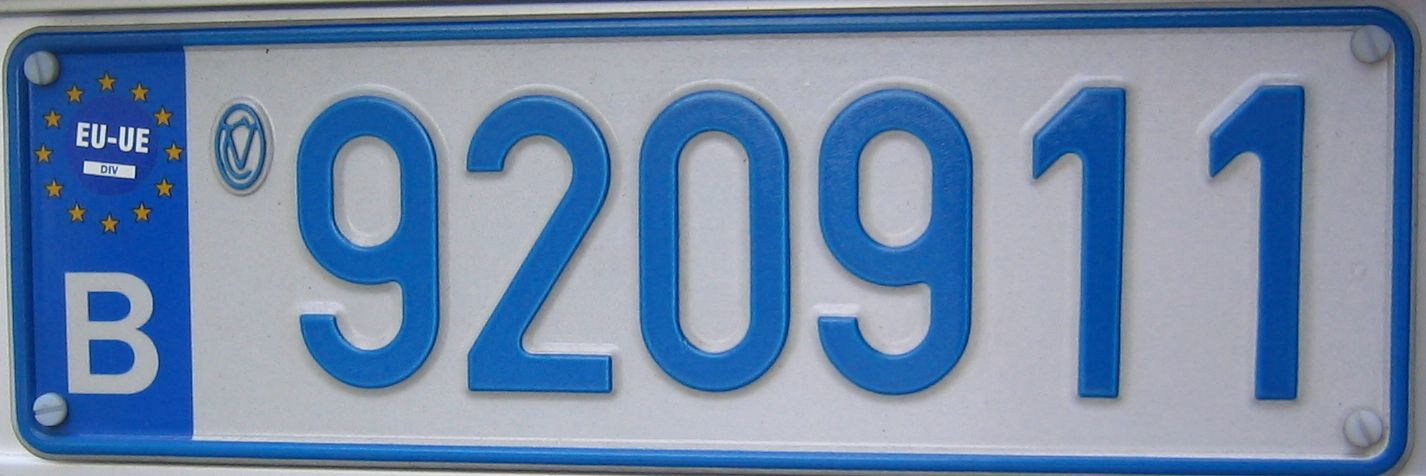
Belgian vehicle registration plate for temporary registration (long-term)

Plates given out to persons working for the international bodies in Belgium, including EU staff. "International" plates can be time-limited (according to the work contract) or have unlimited validity. If applicable, the time limitation is displayed inside the European circle of stars.

The plates have blue characters on a white background. The combination consists of 6 digits without letters. Until now the first digit is always "9". These plates have also been discontinued. Nato, EU, foreign institutions, were carrying a plate with the standard red template, with the 8-aaa-### format.

Since 2014 the NATO, EU, Foreign Institutions registered cars are provided with a standard red Belgian plate in the format N-LLL-NNN where N is a digit and L is a letter.

=== European Institutions ===
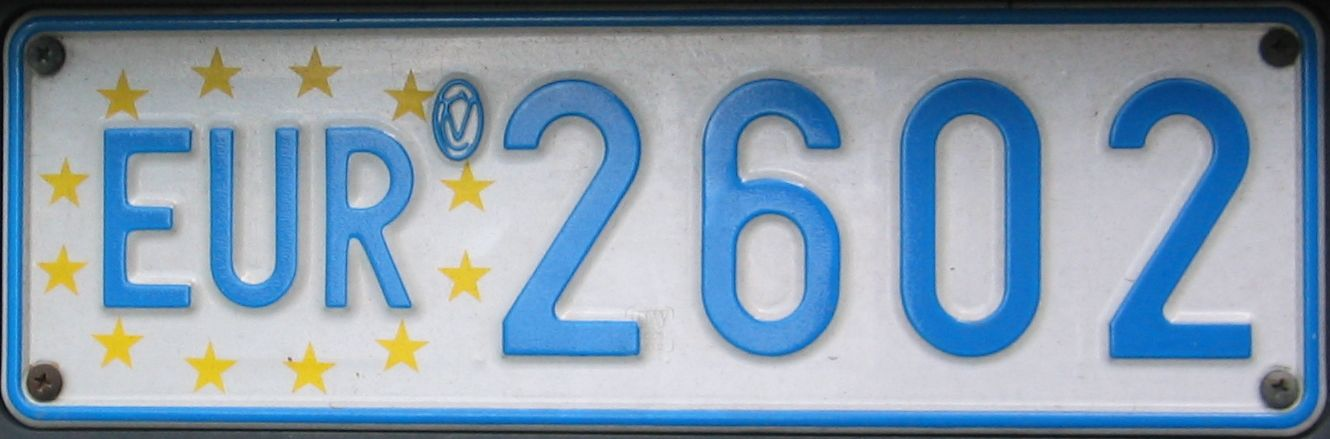
2000-2011 license plate for the EU Institutions

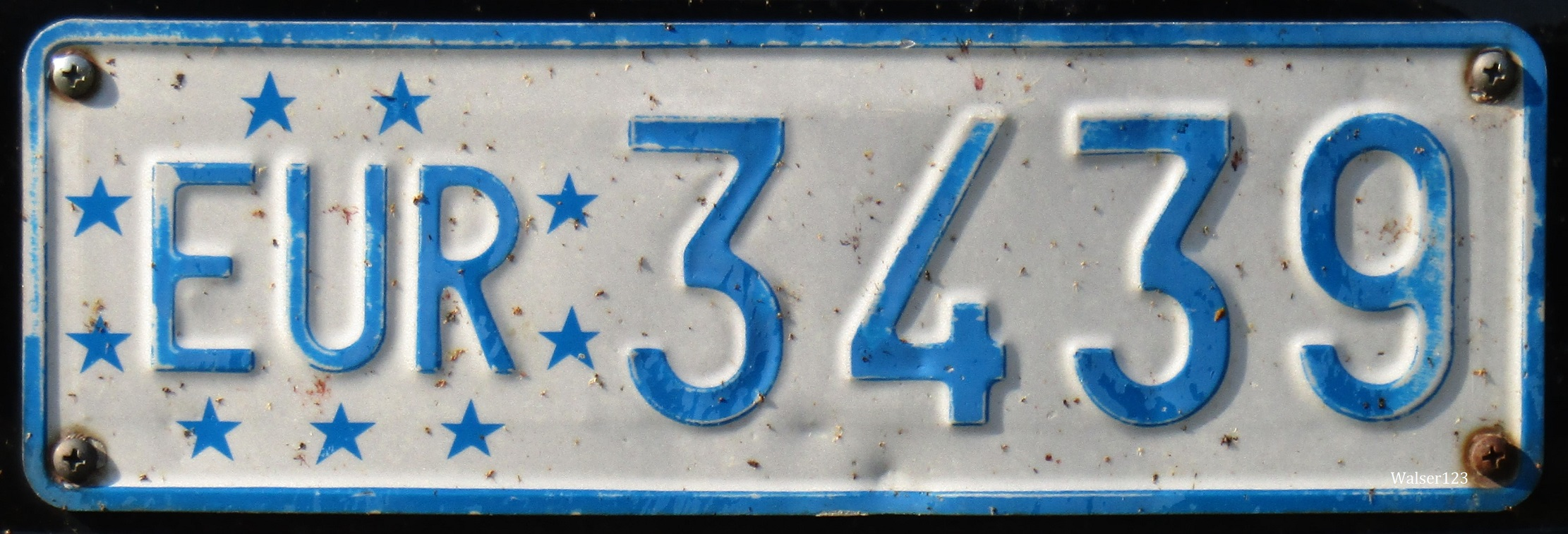
1975-2000 license plate for the EU Institutions

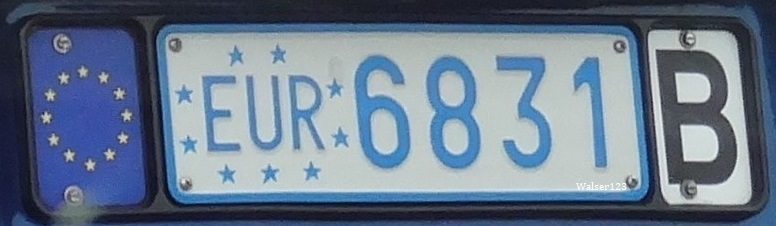
1975-2000 license plate for the EU Institutions

Staff of the institutions of the European Union located in Belgium could previously request a specialized number plate. These plates were blue and displayed the letters "EUR" in a circle of yellow stars on the left hand side. These plates gradually became less popular than the "international" plates as the owner ran the risk of vandalism, since many Belgians erroneously believed that the car owner was not subject to Belgian car tax. From 2011 to mid-2015 these plates were replaced by a different format of a leading digit followed by three letters and three digits, with the leading digit "8" as identifier (8-AAA-111). The so-called 8-plates are no longer issued and staff of international organizations such as NATO, European Union, EuroControl, etc. are, since 2014, issued a standard Belgian plate. Those plates with the 8-LLL-NNN structure will, however, remain assigned until they expire.

=== Eurocontrol ===
Employees of the Eurocontrol Organisation could previously get a blue number plate consisting of three numbers followed by the word "EURO". Like all blue plates, this has also now been discontinued and replaced by the 8-AAA-111 series of plates.

=== Dealer plate ===
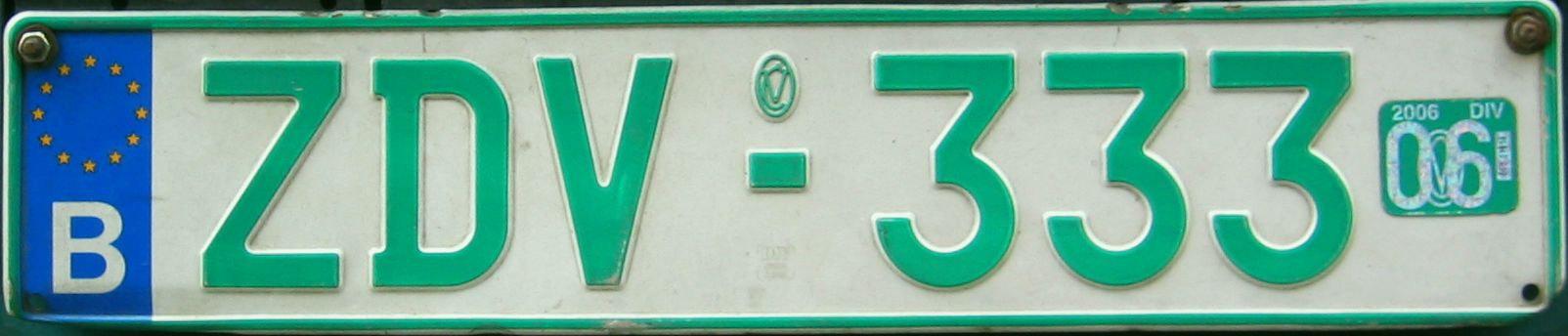
2006 Belgian vehicle registration plate for car dealers

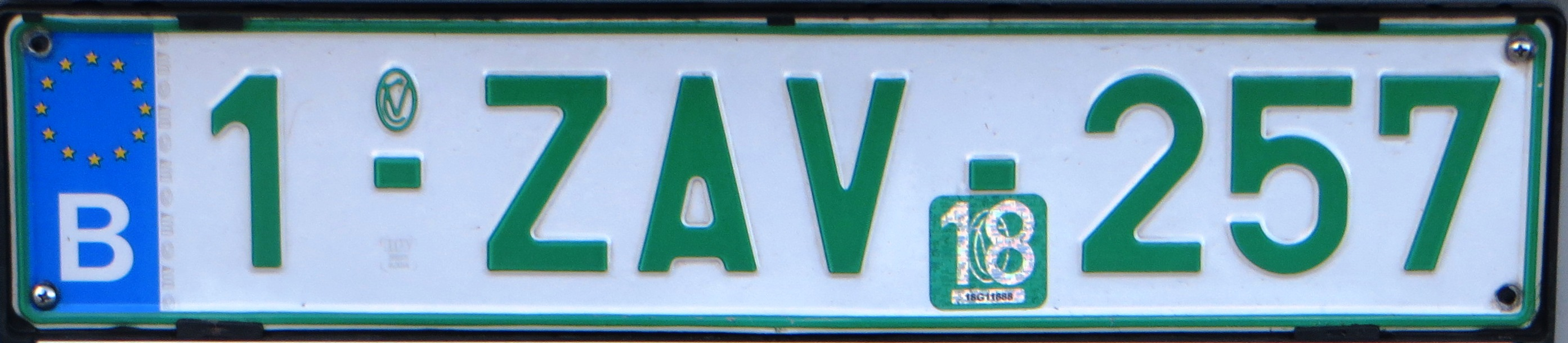
2018 Belgian vehicle registration plate for car dealers

Dealer plates are special plates available only to motor vehicle manufacturers and dealers. They can only be used on vehicles owned by the manufacturer/dealer and must be renewed every year. The dealer is not required to inform the government when transferring the dealer plate to another car, which is a requirement for regular registration plates.

A dealer plate has green letters and numbers on a white background ("green plate"). Furthermore, it has the European flag on the left side. Standard dealer plates have Z as initial letter and A to Y as second letter. Plates starting with "ZZ" are reserved for test drives.

Until 1996 dealer plates were inexpensive and dealers tended to stock significant numbers of them, which they then rented out to owners of very expensive cars (dealer plates were exempt from an extra tax on luxury cars). To combat this fraud the law was changed, making a "green plate" much more expensive; also, police control was increased. As a result, dealers now keep fewer plates and abuse has diminished.

=== Personalized plate ===
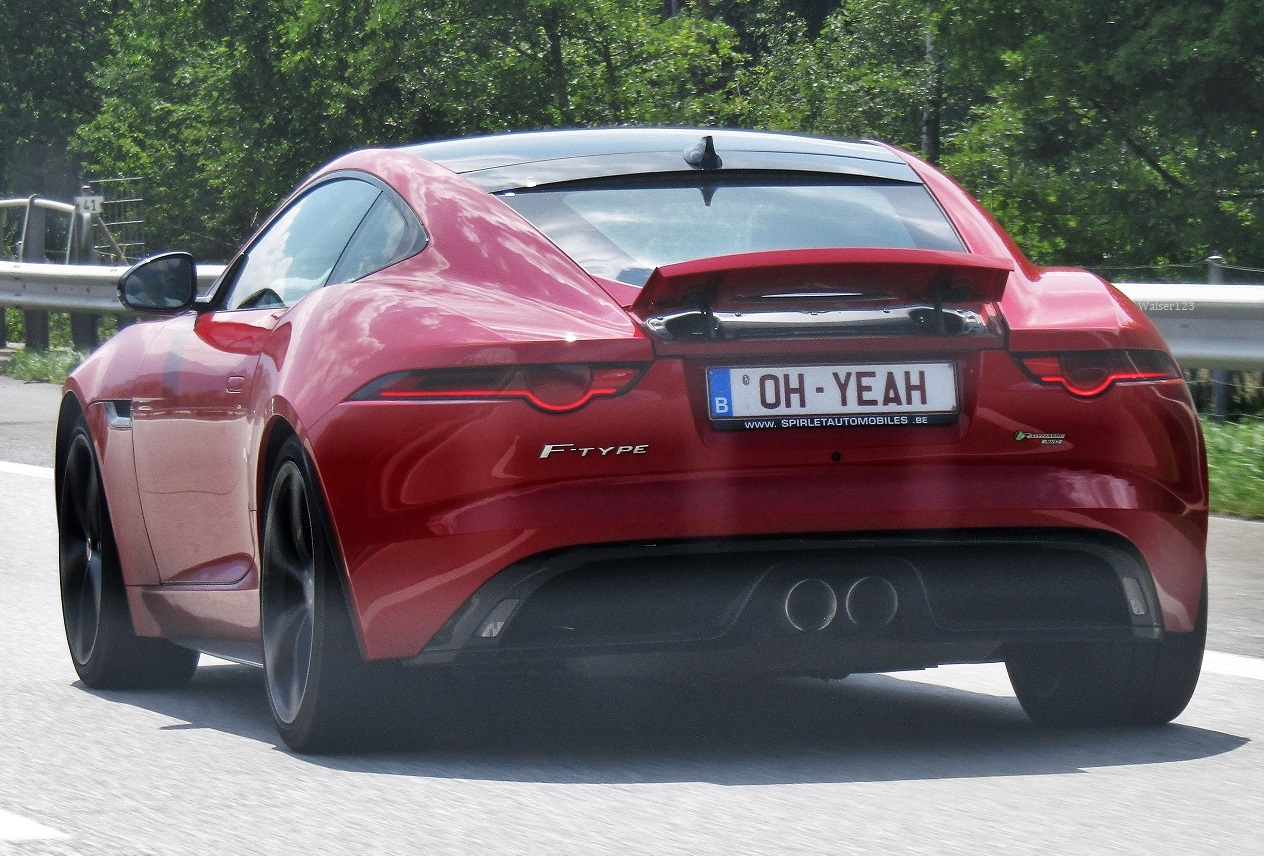
2014 Personalized registration plate

It is possible to obtain a personalized plate. Before 16 November 2010, personalized plates could only have a six-character combination (AAA-111 or 111-AAA) or any of the five-character combinations of the 1951–1973 issues. The combination could be chosen by the owner of the plate with following restrictions:

- The first letter must not conflict with standard rules, e.g. a combination starting with M-O-Q-U-W-Z is not allowed for a normal vehicle plate
- Acronyms of Belgian political parties are not allowed

With the European format, introduced on 16 November 2010, personalized plates would begin with 9, e.g. "9-ABC-123". The possible combinations following the leading "9" were the same as before, i.e. five or six character combinations in the formats issued from 1951 to 2010. Since 31 March 2014, the format is no longer so restrictive, and motorists can fully customize their plate number. However, the plate number must include at least one letter, and cannot imitate number combinations reserved for special uses (i.e. CD-1234 from diplomatic plates, A-0 to A-99999 from official plates, etc.)

=== Temporary plate ===
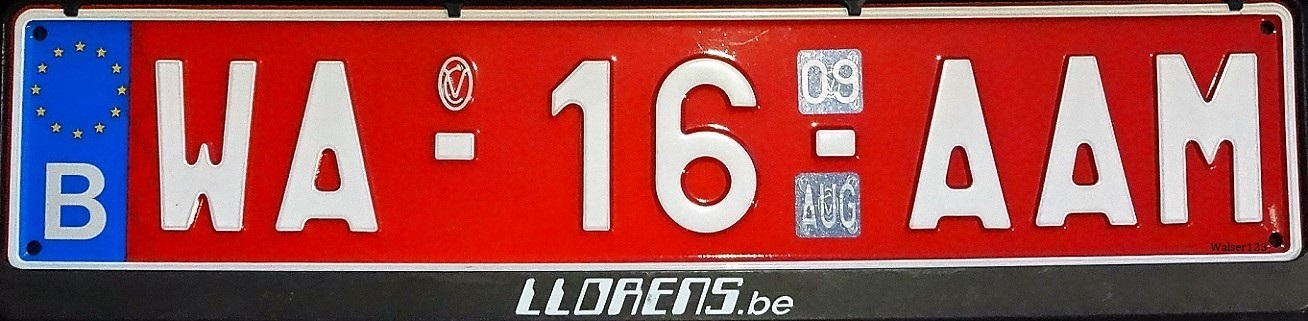
2016 Belgian temporary plate (rear)

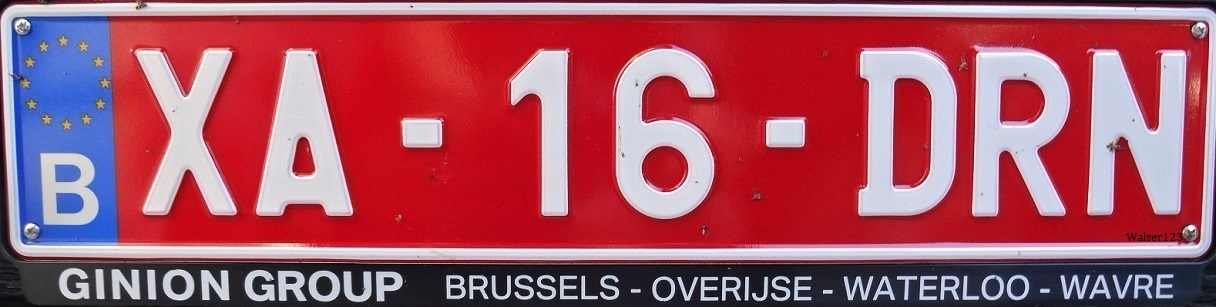
2016 Belgian export plate (front)

Temporary registration plates are issued for vehicles intended for export, either by companies or individuals. They are in a pattern generally reminiscent of other Belgian plates, but with white characters on a red background.

Effective 1 May 2016, the Belgian temporary plate has changed. The Euro-style plate has a blue band on the left, featuring a European circle of stars symbol and the letter B. The characters are stamped and coloured white on a red background, as previously, following a ZA - ## - AAA pattern. The first character is either an X for vehicles intended for export within 30 days, or W for temporarily registered vehicles. The two middle digits are the last two of a calendar year (for example, "16". for 2016). A three-letter indication of the month when the plate becomes effective appears below the second separator. Plates are issued in pairs for all vehicles (one front, one rear), except for motorcycles, mopeds and trailers.

Prior to 2016, these plates only bore numbers (no letters). In 2010, the number of digits increased from six to seven. A year band on the left side (on the right since 2010) indicates the expiration date.

== History ==
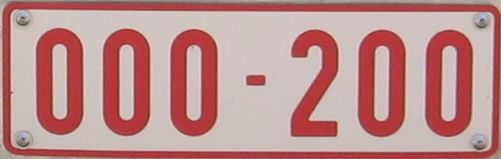
Belgian plate for vintage cars

From 1899 until 1925 and 1928 until 1951, registration plates had 6 numbers. However, their use has now expired. They went through various colour schemes (see below).

From 1925 until 1928 a structure very similar to the 1951-1961 style was used, except the style was fixed (always "A-1234").

From 1951 until 1973 registration plates had 5 characters: one letter and four numbers, or two letters and three numbers, or one letter, three numbers and one letter: "A-1111", "AA-111" and "A-111-A". Because plates are linked to drivers rather than to vehicles, many of these older plates are still in use.

Plates issued between 1973 and 2008 used a combination of three letters followed by three numbers: "AAA-111". In June 2008 a new pattern was introduced with the numbers in front: "111-AAA". By this time the 1973 series had almost run out of combinations. Until the first quarter of 2009 the last plates of the old series (starting with Y, the Z series being reserved for dealer use) were issued simultaneously with the new layout, with the latter reserved at first for registrations made through Internet.

European-style number plates, introduced on 15 November 2010, have seven characters: a leading digit followed by three letters and three digits (1-AAA-111). Distribution of the 111-AAA series stopped at that moment, so that even though plates were printed in this series up to number 999-CFQ, the last ones have never been issued. This and all older series remain valid and no date is set for their expiration.

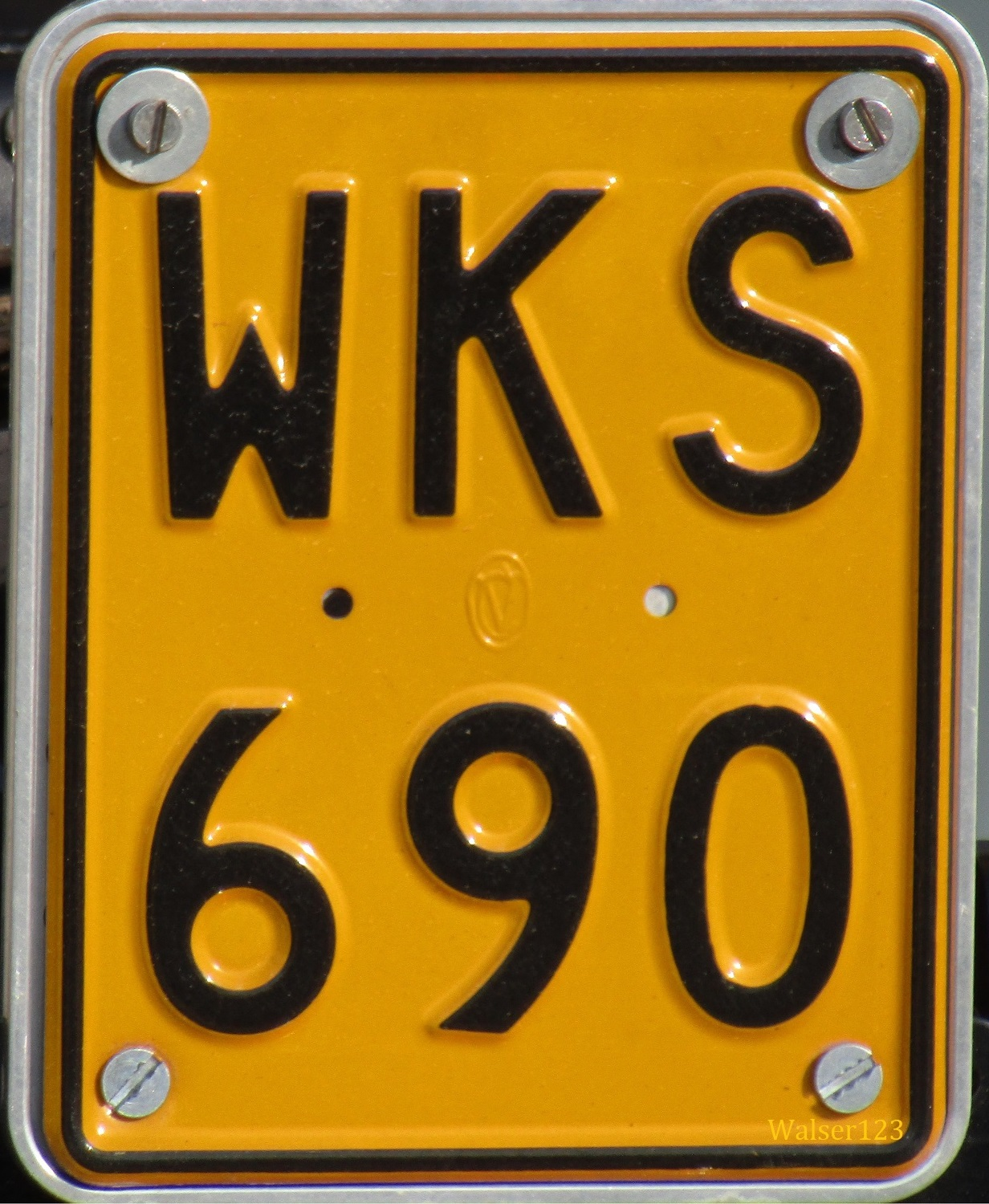
1973-2008 Motorcycle plate

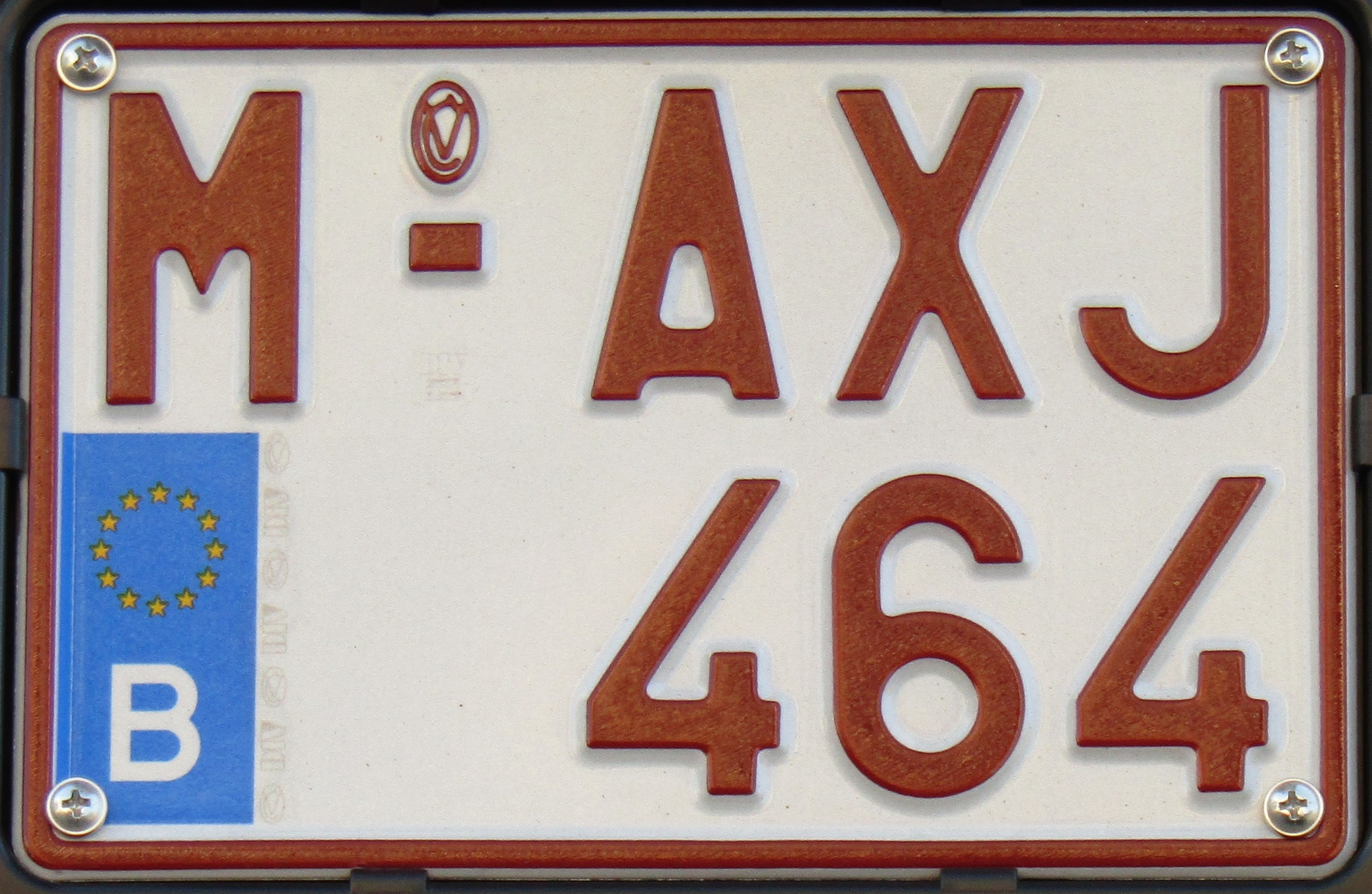
2020 motorcycle plate

Plates for motorcycles with an engine capacity of more than 50 cc issued before November 2010 have black letters on a yellow background and begin with the letters "M" or "W". These plates have a square design, with the three letters on the first row and the three numbers on the second. The newer European plates were red on white like standard vehicle plates and begin with 1-MAA-001. With the introduction of registration plates for (P-AAA-111) and <45 km/h mopeds (S-AAA-111) in 2018, motorcycles got their own design again starting with M: (M-AAA-111) Motorcycles with an engine capacity of less than 50 cc carry no registration plates.

=== Plates no longer in use ===
- 1899–1911: First plates used black letters on white plate.
- 1911–1919: White numbers on black plate. As currently, only the rear plate was provided by the state.
- 1919–1925: White numbers on blue plate.
- 1925–1928: White characters: one letter followed by numbers.
- 1928–1951: Red numbers on white plate.

=== Plates still in use, red on white ===
- 1951-1961: 1 letter, 4 digits (possible layouts: A.1234, 1.A.234, 12.A.34, 123.A.4, 1234.A)
- 1962-1971: 2 letters, 3 digits (possible layouts: AB.123, 1.AB.23, 12.AB.3, 123.AB)
- 1971-1973: 1 letter, 3 digits, 1 letter (A.123.B)
- 1973-2008: 3 letters, 3 digits (ABC.123)
- 2008 (June 25)-2010 (November 15): 3 digits, 3 letters (123.ABC)
- from 2010 (November 15): 1 digit, 3 letters, 3 digits (1-ABC-123)

=== Recent developments ===
Belgium was supposed to start issuing the European registration plates in July 2010. However, with the unexpected collapse of the federal government, the introduction of the new scheme was postponed to 15 November 2010. The last plate from the old series, 999-CFQ, was pressed by State Secretary for Mobility Étienne Schouppe.

The plate meets the European standard format: on the left a blue stripe showing the letter B and a circle of stars.

== Flemish separatism and 'VL' controversy ==
When the new European plate scheme was in the works in 2010, and during the 2007–11 Belgian political crisis, State Secretary for Mobility, Etienne Schouppe, a member of the Flemish CD&V party, proposed a plate style with black text on yellow background, arguing with better readability. This was met with criticism from French Community politicians in the federal government because yellow and black are the official Flemish colours. Eventually, the existing red-on-white style was re-adopted.

On 11 January 2011, amid a wave of separatism in Belgium, the leader of the Flemish populist and nationalist Vlaams Belang party Filip Dewinter arrived in front of the Flemish Parliament, sticking a 'VL' (for Vlaanderen, Flemish name of Flanders) badge over the existing 'B' (for Belgium) on the plates of his vehicle, as well as posing with unofficial VL plates in front of cameras. He encouraged other Flemish people and his party members to get such VL plates, too. The VL plates were denounced by Dirk Van der Maelen of the Flemish Socialistische Partij Anders party, who said it violates Belgian law and that state vehicles registered in the country must carry the 'B' country code. Drivers who violate this law may be liable for a €55 fine. Tanguy Veys of the Vlaams Belang protested (wrongly) that similar nationalist plates are legally used in European regions such as Scotland, Brittany, Wales, England and Catalonia, despite them not being sovereign states. Later that year, the Vlaams Belang started selling self-made yellow numberplates for 13 euros, featuring the VL code and a REPUBLIEK VLAANDEREN ("Republic of Flanders") subtitle.

In 2015 it was reported in the Dutch newspaper De Telegraaf that a royal decree may double the violation fine to 110 euros.

In 2017 it was reported that thousands of cars with VL plates were actively driving. Senator Karl Vanlouwe caused controversy for driving a car with VL, for which he was fined but refused to pay it, arguing in court that it is not illegal.
