= Navaneeda K. Gounder =

Fijian footballer (born 1957)

Navaneeda Krishna Gounder
Personal information
- Full name: Navaneeda Krishna Gounder
- Date of birth: 1 August 1957 (age 69)
- Place of birth: Nadi, Fiji
- Height: 1.80 m (5 ft 11 in)
- Position: Midfielder

Senior career*
Years	Team	Apps	(Gls)
1976	League-Suva		
1977	Nadi Blues		
1978–1984	Young Ones		

International career
1979–1981	Fiji	?	(?)
- * Club domestic league appearances and goals as of 7 March 2008

Navaneeda Krishna Gounder is a former Nadi and Fiji soccer player. He debuted for Nadi in 1977. Gounder was well known right boot and is well documented in an incident where his powerful volley led to a fractured hand of a Rewa goalie. He was part of the champion Nadi team which played in the late 1970s and early 1990s. Under his tenure as the President of Nadi F.C., the club saw success. Under his leadership from 1995, Nadi managed to win the Fiji Fact, Battle of the Giants and Girmit Tourney. In addition to that, Nadi team also were triumphant in the National League and Inter-District Tournament.

== Achievements ==
=== As a player ===
- League Championship (for Districts): 5

1978, 1980, 1981, 1982, 1983

- Battle of the Giants: 3

1978, 1980, 1983

=== As an administrator (President) ===
- League Championship (for Districts) : 2

1998, 2000

- Battle of the Giants: 1

1996

- Fiji Fact: 1

1996

- Inter-District Championship : 3

1998, 1999, 2002

- Fiji Football Association Cup Tournament: 1

1996

- Girmit Soccer Tournament: 1

1996

== General references ==
- A historic win: Message from the President of the Nadi Soccer Association, The Fiji Times, Suva.
- Navaneeda's looks are deceiving: Inter District 79, The Fiji Times, Suva.
