= Department of Transportation, Communications and Infrastructure =

The Department of Transportation, Communications & Infrastructure (TC&I or DTC&I) is a government department of the Federated States of Micronesia. Its headquarters are on the second floor of the Kaselehlie Building in the national government complex in Palikir, Pohnpei State (on Pohnpei Island).

The Division of Civil Aviation (DCI) focuses on aviation issues. The agency conducts aviation accident and incident investigations.

== See also ==
- Air Niugini Flight 73
