= Nadi =

Third largest city in Fiji

Nadi नंदी (Hindi)
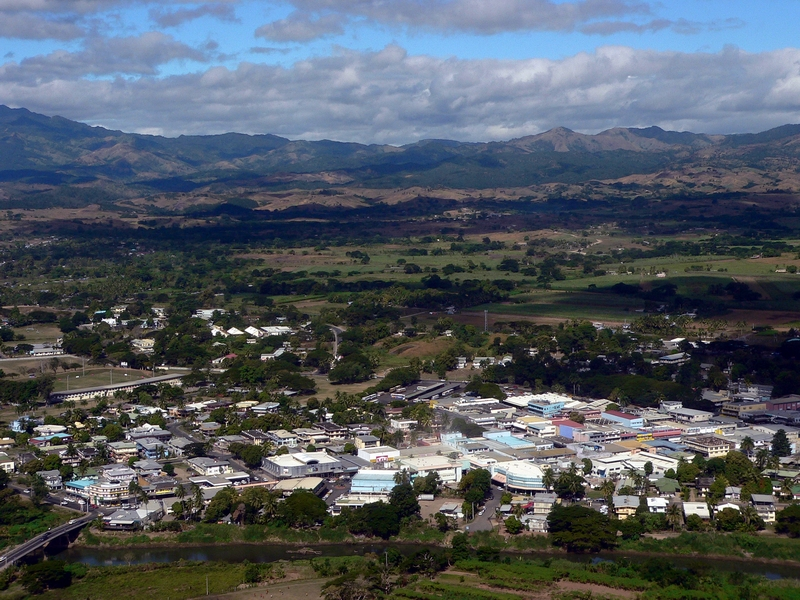
- Nadi from above

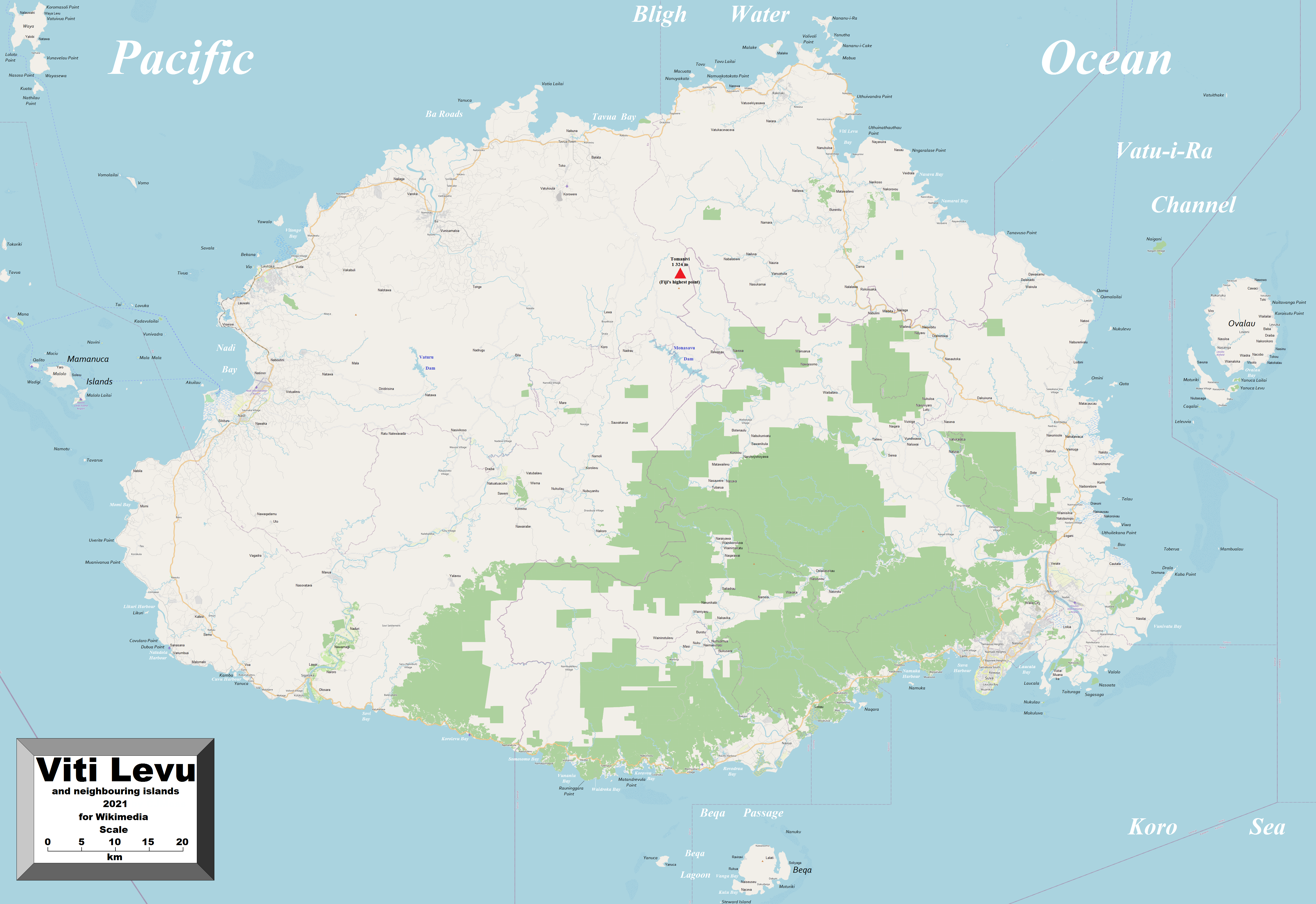
- Viti Levu with Nadi on the west coast

- Location in Fiji
- Coordinates: 17°48′00″S 177°25′00″E
- Country: Fiji
- Island: Viti Levu
- Division: Western Division
- Province: Ba
- District: Nadi

Area
  - Total: 39 sq mi (100 km^{2})

Population (2017)
  - Total: 12,000
  - Tikina: 59,707
- Time zone: UTC+12

Nadi (Fijian: [ˈnandi] nan-DEE, Hindi: नंदी) is the third-largest city in Fiji, after Suva and Lautoka. It is located on the western side of the main island of Viti Levu, and had a population of 59,707 at the most recent census, in 2017. Nadi is multiracial with many of its inhabitants Asians, Indian or Indigenous Fijians, along with a large transient population of foreign tourists. Along with sugar cane production, tourism is a mainstay of the local economy.

The Nadi region has Fiji's highest concentration of hotels and motels. With its large Indo-Fijian population, Nadi is a centre for Hinduism in Fiji. It has the largest Hindu temple in the Southern hemisphere, a site for pilgrims called Sri Siva Subramaniya Temple.

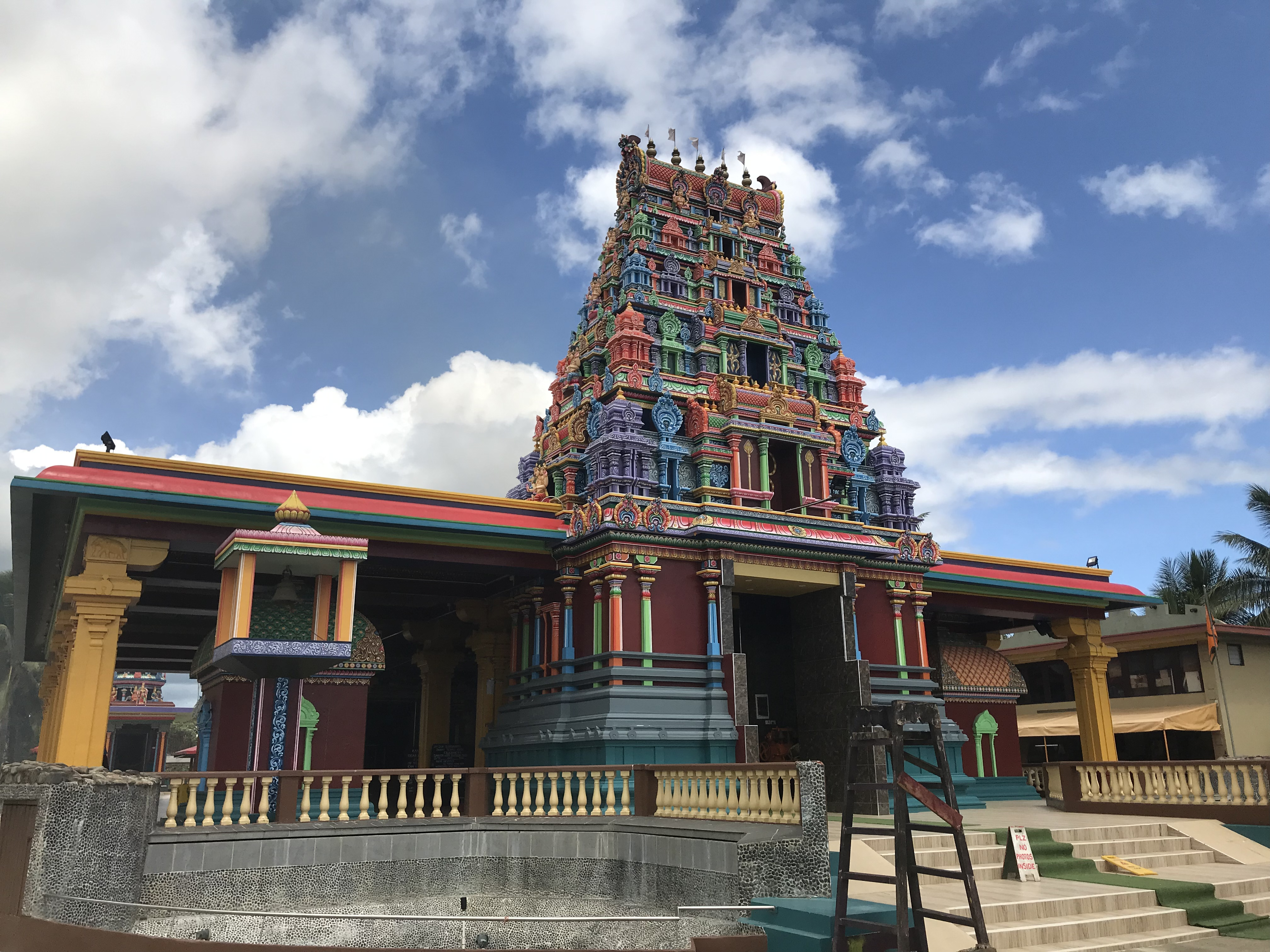
Sri Siva Subramaniya Temple

Nadi International Airport, located 9 kilometres (5.6 mi) from Nadi, is the largest airport in Fiji. Thus, Nadi is the principal port of entry for air travelers to Fiji, even though it is on the opposite (western) side of the island of Viti Levu from the nation's capital and largest city, Suva.

== History ==
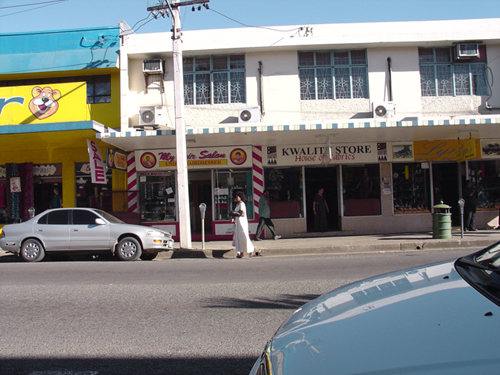
Part of Main Street in Nadi

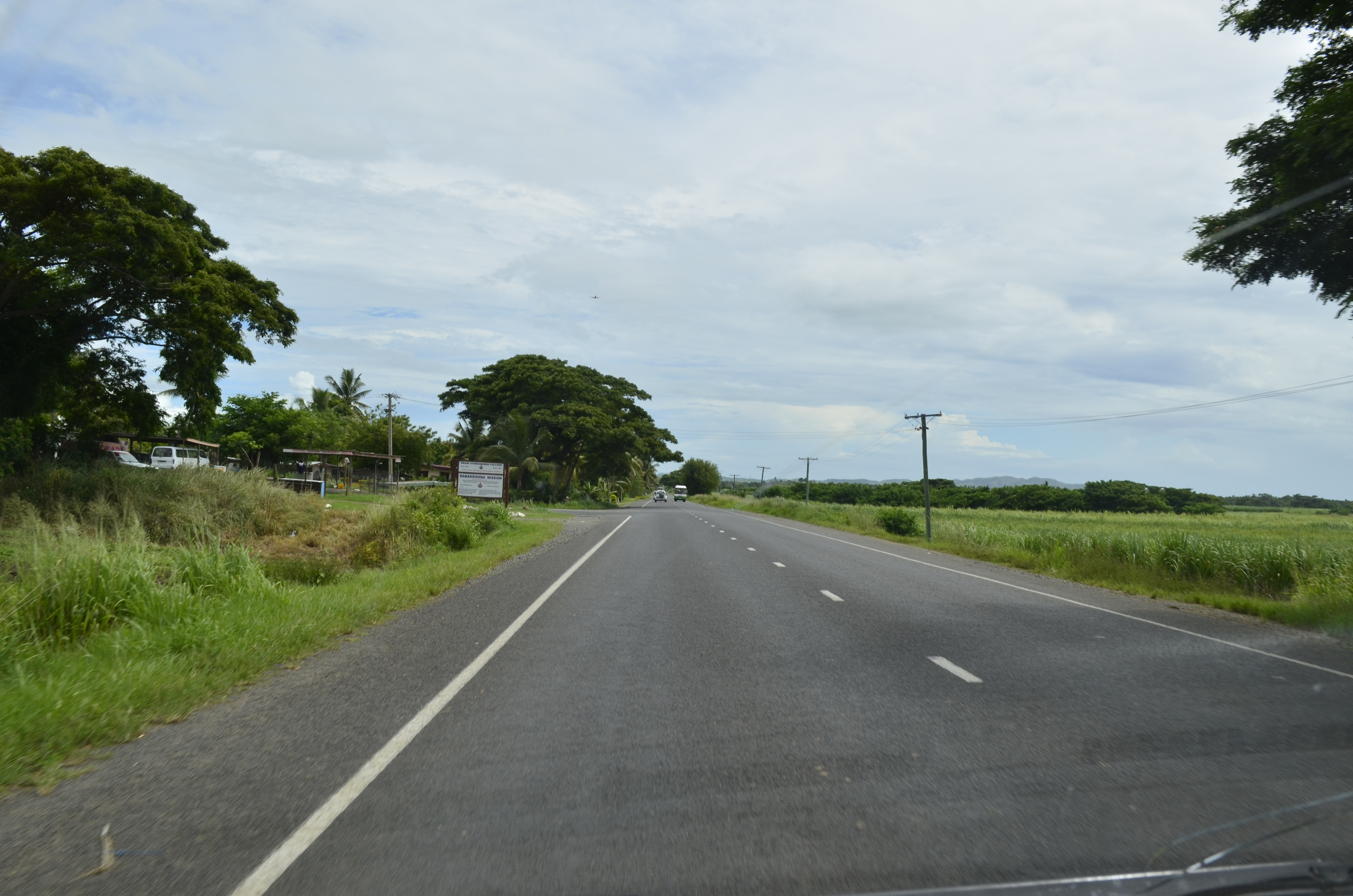
Tarsealed road outside Nadi

During World War II the US Navy built a base at Nadi as part of Naval Base Fiji. Nadi Township was established in 1947. About that time the colonial government of Fiji established offices on the higher grounds of Nadi. A few businesses were then established around the government offices to service them, and other business organisations from other parts of Fiji followed suit. Some concerned citizens of Nadi attempted to move the town centre to Martintar because the existing centre was prone to flooding, but this did not eventuate because the move Nadi Township had already developed strong roots in its existing location.

Elective local government was introduced in 1967 by Dr A. H. Sahu Khan, and was the first elected Chairman of the Nadi Township Board. With the introduction of the Local Government Act in 1972, the status of the Board was changed to a Town Council. H. M. Lodhia became the first Mayor of Nadi in 1972 and remained in office until December 1973. The most recent Mayor of Nadi was Councillor S. Sami. At present, elected municipal government in Nadi (and also throughout Fiji) is suspended, and government-appointed Administrators are carrying out the functions normally fulfilled by the City Council.

== Government and infrastructure ==
The Civil Aviation Authority of Fiji (CAAFI) head office is at Nadi Airport in Nadi.

== Economy ==
Fiji Airways, formerly Air Pacific has its head office at the Air Pacific Maintenance & Administration Centre at Nadi International Airport in Nadi. Fiji Airlines Limited, operating as Fiji Link (formerly Pacific Sun), is headquartered in the Pacific Sun building in the Civil Aviation Authority of Fiji (CAAFI) compound at Nadi International Airport.

Nadi's economy is driven by tourism, transportation and real estate sectors. Within these formal industries, the informal sector plays a relatively small role, mainly consisting of tourism and agricultural businesses, including handicrafts.

== Education ==
- Korovuto College

== Local government ==
Nadi Town is governed by the Nadi Town Council (NTC). The council is headed by a Special Administrator, appointed by the central government, and managed by a Chief Executive Officer (CEO). Both posts answer to the Ministry of Local Government, Urban Development, Housing and Environment. The performance of the Special Administrator is evaluated often, and the position has clear objectives such as improving rates collection and shifting from cash to accrual accounting in council operations. Nevertheless, overlap between the CEO and the Special Administrator posts is leading to confusion, resulting in high staff turnover – there have been three CEOs appointed since 2008.

== Housing ==
Housing development in Nadi largely takes the form of either medium-density complexes or lower-density social housing. Of this latter, the Housing Authority is actively seeking to increase the supply of affordable housing. The number of housing estates in Nadi has grown quickly, especially on the town periphery, such that housing estates now comprise 20 per cent of the total housing stock in Nadi.

== Climate ==
Nadi has a tropical monsoon climate according to the Köppen climate classification, with hot temperatures year round. The city features a short dry season during the months of July and August, and a lengthy wet season covering the remaining months of the year. It receives substantially less precipitation than Suva on the windward side of Fiji.

Climate data for Nadi (Nadi International Airport, 1991–2020 normals)
Month	Jan	Feb	Mar	Apr	May	Jun	Jul	Aug	Sep	Oct	Nov	Dec	Year
Record high °C (°F)	36.7 (98.1)	35.4 (95.7)	35.0 (95.0)	34.3 (93.7)	34.1 (93.4)	33.5 (92.3)	32.9 (91.2)	34.3 (93.7)	34.0 (93.2)	34.6 (94.3)	36.3 (97.3)	35.9 (96.6)	36.7 (98.1)
Mean daily maximum °C (°F)	31.4 (88.5)	31.5 (88.7)	31.3 (88.3)	30.8 (87.4)	29.7 (85.5)	29.0 (84.2)	28.5 (83.3)	28.6 (83.5)	29.2 (84.6)	30.1 (86.2)	30.8 (87.4)	31.4 (88.5)	30.2 (86.4)
Daily mean °C (°F)	27.3 (81.1)	27.4 (81.3)	27.3 (81.1)	26.7 (80.1)	25.4 (77.7)	24.6 (76.3)	23.8 (74.8)	24.0 (75.2)	24.8 (76.6)	25.7 (78.3)	26.5 (79.7)	27.2 (81.0)	25.9 (78.6)
Mean daily minimum °C (°F)	23.3 (73.9)	23.3 (73.9)	23.3 (73.9)	22.6 (72.7)	21.1 (70.0)	20.1 (68.2)	19.2 (66.6)	19.4 (66.9)	20.3 (68.5)	21.3 (70.3)	22.3 (72.1)	23.0 (73.4)	21.6 (70.9)
Record low °C (°F)	19.0 (66.2)	18.3 (64.9)	17.7 (63.9)	16.2 (61.2)	14.0 (57.2)	13.6 (56.5)	11.7 (53.1)	11.3 (52.3)	13.3 (55.9)	14.4 (57.9)	15.1 (59.2)	17.2 (63.0)	11.3 (52.3)
Average precipitation mm (inches)	365.2 (14.38)	335.5 (13.21)	350.5 (13.80)	187.8 (7.39)	92.2 (3.63)	57.0 (2.24)	50.5 (1.99)	64.7 (2.55)	72.3 (2.85)	87.0 (3.43)	126.5 (4.98)	210.2 (8.28)	1,999.4 (78.72)
Average precipitation days (≥ 1.0 mm)	14.1	15.1	16.2	9.9	4.9	3.6	3.1	4.1	4.7	6.5	8.7	11.9	102.8
Average relative humidity (%)	81	82	84	82	80	79	76	75	74	75	76	78	78
Mean monthly sunshine hours	206.9	186.5	192.0	192.8	209.7	198.7	218.4	221.2	202.5	221.4	216.1	215.4	2,481.6
Source 1: World Meteorological Organization
Source 2: NOAADeutscher Wetterdienst (humidity, 1962–1990)

== Notable people ==
- Semi Kunatani (born 1990), rugby union player for the Tel Aviv Heat
- Navaneeda Krishna Gounder (born 1957), former Nadi and Fiji soccer player
