= Sri Siva Subramaniya Temple =

Sri Siva Subramaniya Hindu Temple श्री शिव सुब्रमण्यम हिंदू मंदिर
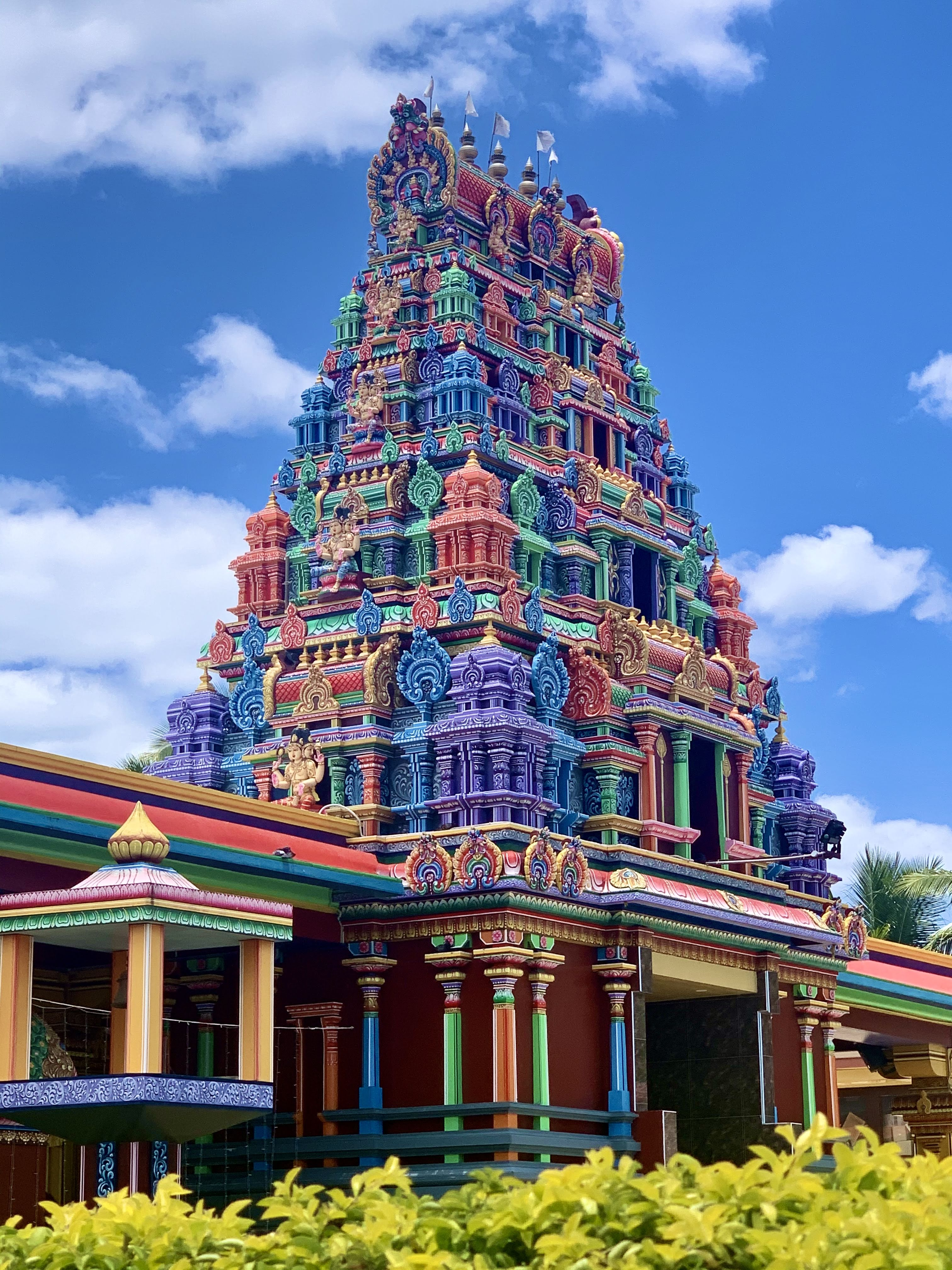

Religion
- Affiliation: Hinduism
- Deity: Shiva and Parvati

Location
- Location: Nadi, Fiji
- Interactive map of Sri Siva Subramaniya Hindu Temple श्री शिव सुब्रमण्यम हिंदू मंदिर
- Coordinates: 17.80731°S 177.41498°E

Architecture
- Type: Dravidian
- Completed: 15 July 1994

The Sri Siva Subramaniya Temple is a Hindu temple in Nadi, Fiji. It is the largest Hindu temple in the Southern Hemisphere. It is at the southern end of the main road through Nadi. In addition to being a significant religious and cultural site for the Indo Fijian community, the temple is a popular tourist attraction.

== Historical background ==
The original temple had been in existence for a long time. It was at the old temple building that the Then India Sanmarga Ikya Sangam (TISI Sangam) was formed in 1926. The TISI Sangam was rejuvenated following the Golden Jubilee celebration in 1976. The revival of Sangam activities with the arrival of Shivacharya Mahalinga Gurukkal, whose services were made available to Nadi Siva Subramaniya Temple in 1984 by the government of Tamil Nadu as the chief priest boosted the activities at the temple. Devotees flocked there in very large numbers to witness and participate in the many new and unique religious ceremonies conducted at the temple for the first time.

== Construction of new temple ==
The foundation for a new temple was laid at the old site in 1976 during the Golden Jubilee celebrations by His Excellency the High Commissioner for the government of India in Fiji. It was realised that a new and bigger national temple was needed. In 1983 new lease was acquired for the Crown land and the reconstruction programme began with the Bhoomi Pooja in January 1984, followed by the inauguration of building work by the late deputy prime minister, in April 1984. The construction work moved another step forward in 1986 when the work of pile driving was completed under the chairmanship of Hon. Jai Ram Reddy. The actual construction work began in earnest after a lull of some five years under a new Reconstruction Committee led by Narayan Reddy as the chairman. The temple was built in the Dravidian style as well as the principles of sacred architecture of the Vastu Vedic tradition. The consecration ceremonies of their new national temple were held on 15 July 1994.

To mark the centennary of TISI Sangam in 2026, artisans from Tamil Nadu travelled to Nadi to repaint and restore the temple's ornate carvings and artworks, aiming to preserve the site's religious and cultural heritage.

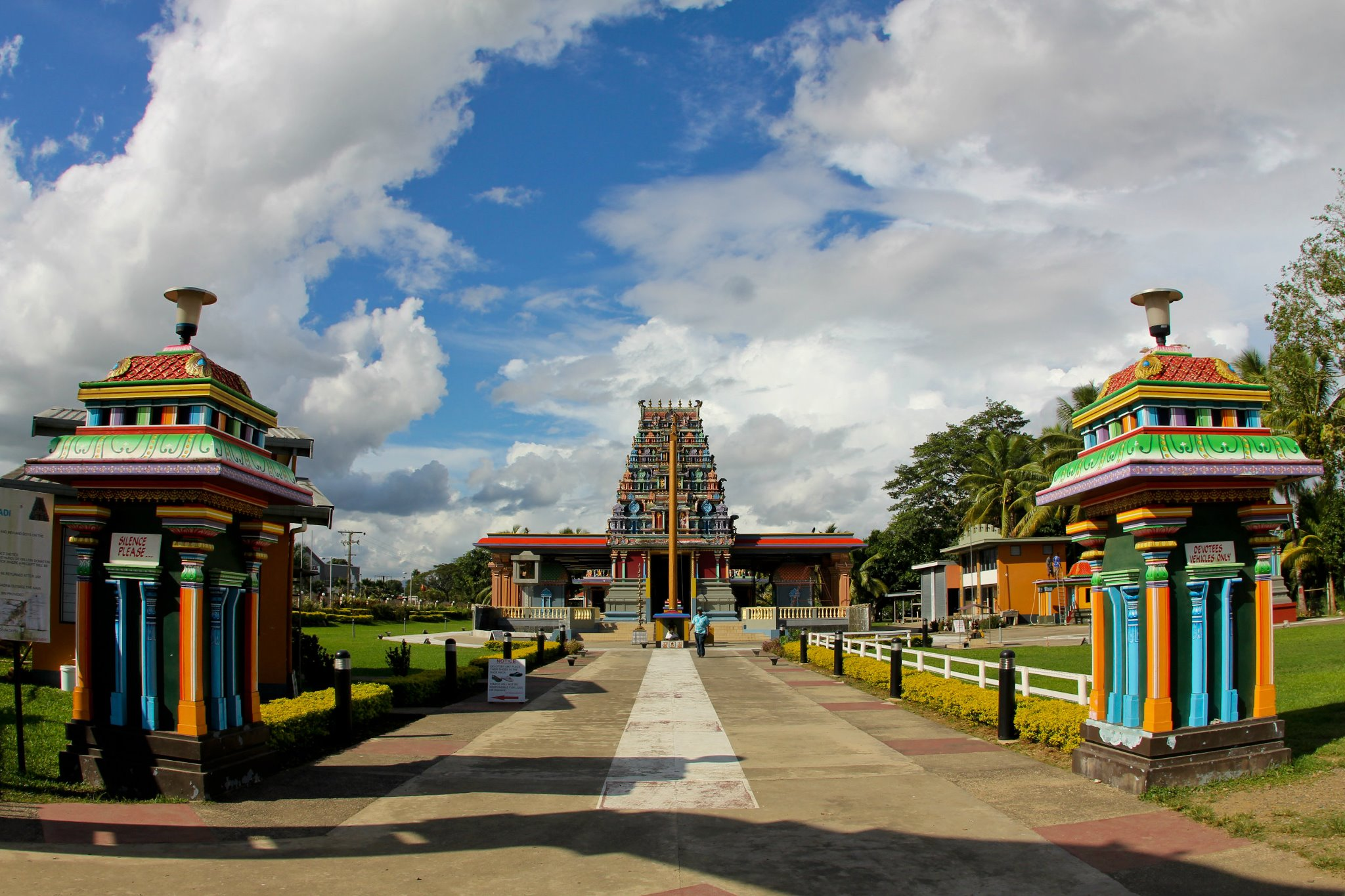
Sri Siva Subramaniya Temple

== Tourism ==
As the largest Hindu temple in the Southern Hemisphere, the Nadi Swami temple has become a popular tourist attraction due to its architecture, carvings and spiritual presence. Guided tours are available to visitors, however the inner sanctums are reserved for worshippers. There is a restaurant located on the temple grounds serving traditional vegetarian dishes.
