= Air Niugini Flight 73 =

2018 aviation accident in Micronesia

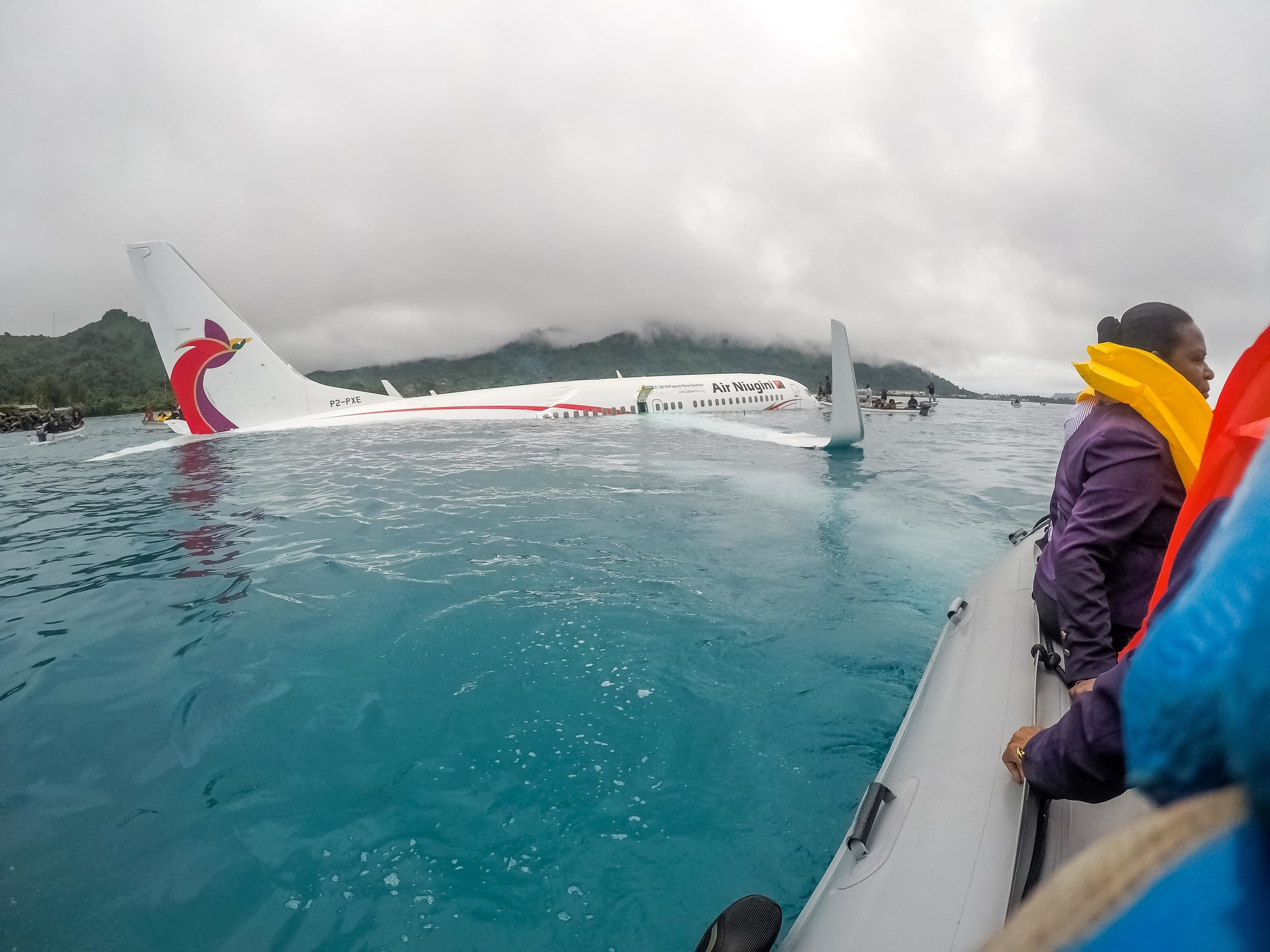
- The aircraft in Chuuk Lagoon after ditching

Accident
- Date: 28 September 2018
- Summary: Accidentally ditched short of the runway due to pilot error and loss of situational awareness
- Site: Chuuk Lagoon, off from Chuuk International Airport; 7°27′12.55″N 151°50′9.86″E

Aircraft
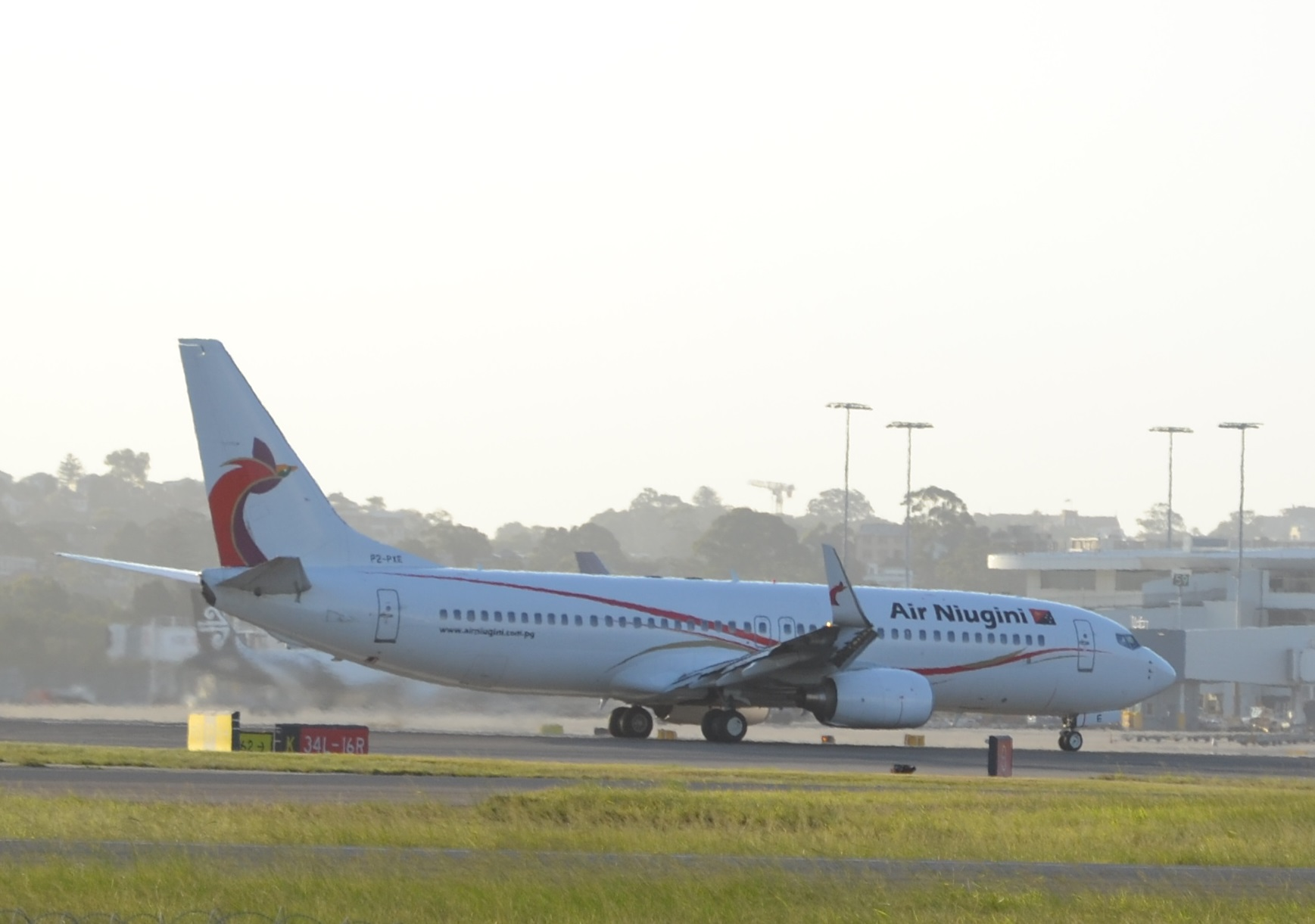
- P2-PXE, the aircraft involved in the accident, seen in 2015
- Aircraft type: Boeing 737-8BK
- Operator: Air Niugini
- IATA flight No.: PX073
- ICAO flight No.: ANG073
- Call sign: NIUGINI 73
- Registration: P2-PXE
- Flight origin: Pohnpei International Airport, Micronesia
- Stopover: Chuuk International Airport, Micronesia
- Destination: Port Moresby International Airport, Papua New Guinea
- Occupants: 47
- Passengers: 35
- Crew: 12
- Fatalities: 1
- Injuries: 6
- Survivors: 46

Air Niugini Flight 73 was a scheduled service from Pohnpei, Federated States of Micronesia (FSM) to Port Moresby, Papua New Guinea, via Chuuk State, FSM. On 28 September 2018, a Boeing 737-800, operated by Air Niugini, landed short of the runway at Chuuk International Airport in Weno (FSM) and came to rest in Chuuk Lagoon. Local people in small boats rescued most passengers and all crew members. One passenger was found dead by rescue divers. Forty-six people survived, six of whom were injured.

== Aircraft and crew ==
The accident aircraft was a Boeing 737-8BK, registration P2-PXE, msn 33024, Boeing line number 1688. It had first flown on 1 April 2005. The aircraft was powered by two CFM International CFM56-7B26 engines. At the time of the accident, the aircraft had accumulated 37,160 hours and 36 minutes flight time over 14,788 cycles.

The aircraft was first delivered for Air India Express and was registered as VT-AXC on 19 April 2005. On 6 July 2005, it was damaged in a runway excursion on landing at Cochin International Airport, India. On 29 July 2010, the aircraft was sold to Jet Airways and registered VT-JBT. It was sold to CIT Leasing Corporation on 24 July 2013 and registered M-ABGK before being sold to Loftleiðir, which leased the aircraft to Air Niugini on 13 September 2013, registered P2-PXE. On 12 May 2018, it was struck by a Lockheed L-100 Hercules, registered as N403LC, of Lynden Air Cargo whilst parked at Port Moresby International Airport, sustaining damage to its right winglet.

The captain and pilot in command was a 52-year-old Papua New Guinean man who had 19,780 flight hours, including 2,276 hours on the Boeing 737. The first officer was a 35-year-old Australian man who had 4,618 flight hours, with 368 of them on the Boeing 737. An engineer from Loftleiðir was also on board and was sitting in the cockpit jump seat. He was filming the landing for personal use on his cell phone. The video was used in the subsequent investigation.

== Accident ==
The aircraft was operating an internationally scheduled passenger flight from Pohnpei International Airport, FSM to Port Moresby International Airport, Papua New Guinea via Chuuk International Airport, FSM. At 10:10 local time (00:10 UTC), the aircraft landed in the Chuuk lagoon 1,500 feet (460 m; 500 yd) short of Chuuk International Airport. Initial reports stated that all 12 crew and 35 passengers were rescued by local boats and United States Navy personnel. However, a male Indonesian passenger was reported missing after the evacuation. Three days of searching failed to locate the missing passenger seated at 23A, and the investigating commission requested a verification search of the airplane. On 1 October 2018, Japanese divers located the passenger between partially submerged seat rows 22 and 23, in the vicinity of a fuselage fracture; he had not been wearing a seatbelt. Air Niugini had previously stated that the deceased passenger had been seen by other passengers evacuating the aircraft. Nine people were taken to hospital. Six passengers were seriously injured. Some of the injured sustained broken bones. It was reported that there were thunderstorms in the vicinity of the airport at the time of the accident. The aircraft subsequently sank in 30 metres (100 ft) of water.

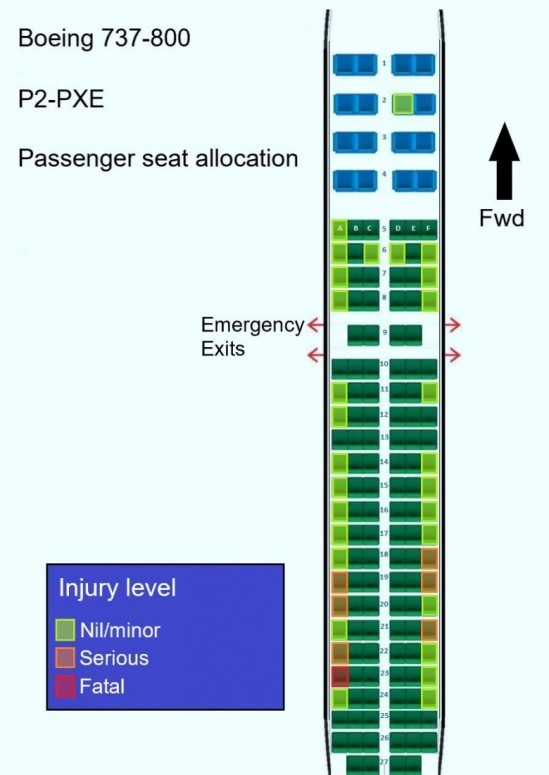
Flight 73's seat map

== Investigation ==
The Papua New Guinea Accident Investigation Commission opened an investigation into the accident. The Micronesian government delegated the investigation to the Papua New Guinea government on 14 February.

The Department of Transportation, Communications and Infrastructure in the Federated States of Micronesia issued a preliminary report on 26 October. It stated that the body of the deceased passenger was recovered from the aircraft. Pathological analysis found that the passenger had succumbed to injuries within three minutes of impact. An autopsy determined that there was a lack of trauma around the waist and hips, indicating that the passenger "was not wearing a seat-belt" at the time of the crash, "which allowed his body to become a projectile sustaining traumatic head and facial injuries".

On 18 July 2019, the Papua New Guinea Accident Investigation Commission issued its final report: the flight crew did not comply with Air Niugini Standard Operating Procedures, nor the approach or pre-landing checklists, and did not adequately brief the approach. The flight path became unstable after autopilot disconnect. The Precision Approach Path Indicator was showing three white lights just before entering Instrument Meteorological Conditions (IMC). The rate of descent significantly exceeded 1,000 feet per minute (300 m/min) in IMC. The glideslope deviated from half dot low to two dots high within nine seconds after passing the Minimum Descent Altitude. The flight crew heard, but disregarded, thirteen Enhanced Ground Proximity Warning System (EGPWS) aural alerts (Glideslope and Sink Rate) and flew a 4.5° average glideslope. EGPWS showed a visual PULL UP warning on the Primary flight display. The pilots lost situational awareness. The approach was unstabilized, but the captain did not execute a missed approach. The copilot was ineffective and oblivious to the rapidly unfolding unsafe situation. The continuous alarm WHOOP WHOOP PULL UP aural warning could have been effective in alerting the crew of the imminent danger.

The final report stated confusion led to a botched evacuation of the airplane. According to cabin crew members, the word 'evacuate' was not understood by some of the passengers. Several passengers took their cabin baggage with them against instructions. However some cabin crew members acted with conspicuous courage, retrieving passengers lying underwater in the aisle or still strapped in their seats. The report concluded the Papua New Guinea Civil Aviation Safety Authority "did not meet the high standard of evidence-based assessment required for safety assurance, resulting in numerous deficiencies and errors".

== See also ==
- Lion Air Flight 904 – A Boeing 737 that crashed in similar circumstances in April 2013
