= Papua New Guinea Accident Investigation Commission =

The Papua New Guinea Accident Investigation Commission (PNGAIC) is an agency of the Government of Papua New Guinea (GoPNG) investigating aviation accidents and serious incidents. The office is located in Level 1, NAQIA Building, Morea-Tobo Road, 6 Mile, National Capital District.

== History ==
In 2000 the National Parliament amended the Civil Aviation Act separating and establishing the current four separate State Aviation Enterprises in the sector, namely the Civil Aviation Safety Authority (CASA PNG), PNG Air Services Limited (PNGASL), the Accident Investigation Commission (AIC), and the National Airports Corporation (NAC).

The AIC cooperates with other Government agencies that have powers relating to transport safety, in particular the Department of Transport and Infrastructure, the Civil Aviation Authority, PNG Air Services Limited, and the National Maritime Safety Authority (NMSA).

This makes the AIC an independent agency that conducts investigations, compiles reports and makes safety recommendations under the Act. Papua New Guinea is a signatory to the Chicago Convention on International Civil Aviation. In consequence, the GoPNG is required to investigate aviation accidents and serious incidents, and to publish the findings, in accordance with Annex 13 to the Convention. Not doing so would place PNG in breach of its international obligations and could compromise the country's standing as a member of the international aviation community. The AIC is accountable to Parliament through the Minister for Civil Aviation.

The AIC's primary function is to improve aviation safety by investigating accidents and serious incidents, determining the factors that affect, or may affect, aviation safety, and communicating its findings to relevant stakeholders. The AIC conducts its investigations on a ‘no-blame’ basis. This means the AIC does not apportion blame or liability, and does not seek to determine any liability of persons or organisations in transport matters. Investigations that focus on future safety rather than blame increase stakeholder awareness of, and action on, safety issues and foster industry and public confidence in the transport system. Publishing reports which explain how and why accidents and serious incidents occurred increases safety awareness and knowledge, and forms the basis for stakeholders to improve safety action.

Annex 13, other relevant annexes to the Convention on International Civil Aviation, and ICAO documents and circulars relevant to aircraft accident and serious incident investigation set out the standards and procedures against which the AIC benchmarks its work. The AIC has full-time investigation staff with a background in the aviation industry (flying operations, engineering, and air traffic control). These investigators are trained to conduct investigations and write reports in accordance with the standards and recommended practices of Annex 13. In addition to its own staff, the AIC may draw on industry expertise, both national and international, by appointing Expert Assessors to investigations if necessary and as provided for by Section 242 of the Act.

Independent investigation of aviation accidents and incidents by a PNG safety investigation agency will make a significant contribution to domestic aviation safety and in some circumstances will contribute to aviation safety worldwide. The AIC is thus a key player in aviation safety.

Previously the head office was Enga House 1.

The AIC was formed after a 2008 Australian Broadcasting Corporation exposé over air safety in PNG which revealed a lack of investigation of air disasters.

== Investigations ==
- Airlines PNG Flight 1600
- Airlines PNG Flight 4684
- Air Niugini Flight 73

== See also ==
- Pacific Aviation Safety Office
