= Korovuto College =

Coordinates: 17.8399°S 177.3718°E

Korovuto College is an educational institution funded privately and publicly by the committee of the school. It is located in a suburban area of Fiji's international town, Nadi. The school has about 700 students and 50 staff members. Most students are from Nadi, but some come from neighbouring cities such as Lautoka, and most students are Indo-Fijians. The institution provides students with knowledge from form 1 to form 7, and has been extended to a vocational center. Primary education can be gained from the neighbouring primary school. It is located on 22 acres of land.

== Staff ==
The founder of the school was late Sukhai Mahajan, father of late RAM Karan, Trustee of Korovuto who donated the land for the school The very first principal of Korovuto College was Mr Mahendra Kumar (1976 -1980). Korovuto College's principals in recent years have been Mr. Sateesh Sudhakar, Mr. Chettiar, Mrs. Anita Gounder, and currently, Mr. Rikesh Nand Reddy. The vice principal is Mrs. Ranjini Chand and the assistant principal is MR Nilesh Ram. Other Principals were Ganesh Prasad, Shris Chand, Jai Karan. There are two form 1 and twos, three forms 3-6, and one form 7. (The school emerged as Korovuto Junior Secondary School from Korovuto Primary School in 1976. Classes 7&8 converted to Forms 1&2 and then to Forms 3&4. Then it extended to Forms 5&6. Gradually Form 7 commenced at the school and the name was changed from secondary to college.

== Enrollment ==
In 2004 the school had 591 students enrolled and then in 2006 there were 652 students.

== Motto and mission ==
The school's motto is "Truth is Victory." The mission of the school is to provide a quality education that enables one to fit into the dynamic society, and to promote and support the learning process to develop the physical, social, intellectual and spiritual well-being of students for national development and international acceptance.
