= Department for Aviation (Belarus) =

Belarusian government agency

Logo of the Committee

The Department for Aviation (Belarusian: Дэпартамент па авіяцыі, romanized: Departamient pa avijacyi, Russian: Департамент по авиации), previously the State Committee of Aviation of the Republic of Belarus (Belarusian: Дзяржаўны камітэт па авіяцыі Рэспублікі Беларусь, Russian: Государственный комитет по авиации Республики Беларусь) is a government agency of Belarus, subordinate to the Ministry of Transport and Communications and is headquartered in Minsk. It was previously headquartered at Aerodromnaja Street in Minsk.

It was established by the President of Belarus in 2006 to coordinate aviation activity inside Belarus. It is comparable to civil aviation agencies around the world in its activities and duties. The committee (Госкомавиация) works with other state bodies and agencies (bodies), companies and organizations.

All civil aviation activities and civil airports fall under the jurisdiction of the committee. Several repair facilities, air traffic control towers and aviation schools also fall under the jurisdiction of the committee.

Since 1993, Belarus has been an accredited member of the International Civil Aviation Organization. Historically, during the period when Belarus was a republic of the Soviet Union, the activities of the committee were handled by the Russian civil aviation authority, Aeroflot.

== Airlines ==
Though it is not known how many airlines operate and are registered in Belarus, one airline called Belavia has membership in the IATA. Belavia (Белавиа) is short for Belarusian Airlines, was established in 1996 by state law and is the only Belarusian member of the IATA. Belavia was formed from the Belarusian Association of Civil Aviation, which already had over 60 years of experience in the transportation of people and cargo.

Two other airlines are operating under the committee, but they do not hold the title of National Air Carrier. The two airlines, which hold the title of Air Carrier are Gomelavia Airlines and TransAVIAexport Airlines. Gomelavia performs charter services for Belarusian oil workers who need to be sent to the western regions of Siberia, Transaviaexport is used by the Belarusian Government as their official planes when moving cargo.
