= Bermuda Civil Aviation Authority =

Agency overview
- Formed: 1931
- Jurisdiction: Government of Bermuda
- Headquarters: St. George's; 32°22′46″N 64°40′40″W
- Agency executive: Thomas Dunstan, Director
- Parent department: Ministry of Tourism and Transport
- Website: www.bcaa.bm

Footnotes
- Sources: BDCA

The Bermuda Civil Aviation Authority (BCAA) is the civil aviation authority of Bermuda. It has its headquarters in St. George's.

The body is organised into four departments, namely Airworthy, Operations, Flight Operations, and Administration. As of March 2012, Thomas Dunstan is the Director.

== History ==
First established in 1931, its name was changed from Bermuda Department of Civil Aviation in October 2016. The Authority is responsible for overseeing safety regulations for all aircraft registered in Bermuda, including both private and commercial aircraft. It is a member of the Convention on International Civil Aviation.

== See also ==
- List of civil aviation authorities
