= Civil Aviation Authority of Kosovo =

- Abbreviation: CAAK - AACK
- Formation: 2009
- Type: Regulatory agency
- Purpose: Regulation of civil aviation
- Headquarters: Pristina, Kosovo
- Location: Zejnel Salihu no. 22
- Region served: Kosovo
- Members: ECAA
- Official language: Albanian, Serbian, English
- Director General: Arianit Islami
- Parent organization: MESPI
- Website: www.caa-ks.org

Civil Aviation Authority of the Republic of Kosovo or CAAK (Albanian: Autoriteti i Aviacionit Civil; Serbian: Autoritet Civilnog Vazduhoplovstva) was established under Law No. 03/L-051 on Civil Aviation as an independent civil aviation regulatory agency. CAAK is responsible for the regulation of civil aviation safety and the economic regulation of airports and air navigation services in the Republic of Kosovo. Civil Aviation activities in Kosovo air space are carried out in accordance with the provisions of the Law on Civil Aviation, the Convention on International Civil Aviation of 7 December 1944, and the Agreement on the Establishment of a European Common Aviation Area.

Regulations and requirements are constantly being developed to align Kosovo’s aviation legislation and procedures with international requirements such as the Standards and Recommended Practices of the International Civil Aviation Organization and, particularly with EU aviation acquis as part of its obligations under European Common Aviation Agreement (ECAA), to which Kosovo is a party.

== Duties ==
CAAK has enforcement mandate for achieving compliance with the regulations and standards.

As Civil Aviation Regulators, CAAK:

- Implements civil aviation legislation and implements policies adopted by the Republic of Kosovo Ministry of Infrastructure or the Government in the field of civil aviation;
- Provides advice and proposals to the Ministry, the Government and the Assembly regarding policies and legislation for the civil aviation sector, issues implementing regulations and air navigation orders, in accordance with the Law on Civil Aviation and the ECAA Agreement;
- Issues licenses, certificates and permits in accordance with the CAAK’s competencies and responsibilities;
- Regulates the safety of air transportation in the Republic of Kosovo;
- Regulates the economics of airports and air navigation services;
- Provides advice to the Minister in connection with the Minister’s development of proposed policies for the use of Kosovo airspace that meet the needs of users, taking into account national security, economic and environmental factors, and the need for a high standard of safety;
- Supervises and ensures effective implementation of civil aviation legislation, standards, rules, procedures and orders, except where the Law on Civil Aviation or another primary normative act specifically and exclusively assigns such a function to the Ministry or another public authority;
- Disseminates information to the public about matters relevant to the functions and activities of the CAAK;
- Perform such acts, conduct such investigations and inspections, and issue such orders, rules, regulations, and/or procedures as CAAK may deem reasonably necessary to properly and lawfully:
  - implements the applicable provisions of the Law on Civil Aviation or
  - discharge the powers and duties assigned to CAAK by the Law on Civil Aviation;
- Perform any other functions pertaining to civil aviation in Kosovo assigned to CAAK by the Law on Civil Aviation or another primary normative act.

== History ==
Civil Aviation Authority of Kosovo started its life in 2003 as the Civil Aviation Regulator Office (CARO) under UN supervision. In 2009 after the independence of Kosovo CARO was converted into an independent Civil Aviation Authority.
