= Bosnia and Herzegovina Directorate of Civil Aviation =

Aviation regulator in Bosnia and Herzegovina

The Bosnia and Herzegovina Directorate of Civil Aviation is a government office of Bosnia and Herzegovina charged with performing oversight and regulatory actions for civil aviation and air traffic control. Its current Director General is Čedomir Šušnjar. It was admitted to the European Civil Aviation Conference in November of 2002, and is an International Civil Aviation Organization member state. Though not part of EASA, it is one of EASA's pan-European partners and cooperates with EASA on the implementation of EASA safety rules.

== Duties and responsibilities ==
The BHDCA is responsible for areas such as safety oversight (where it conducts inspections), safety regulation, airspace monitoring (with several other groups it forms the Aviation Committee for airspace management in Bosnia and Herzegovina), providing and charging money for navigational services, and other regulatory functions.

== Notable actions ==
- Oct 21, 2020: The BHDCA updated the communications technology used throughout the three airports in BiH. This has brought ATC communications in line with the recommended practices of ICAO.
