= Federal Public Service Mobility and Transport =

Belgian federal public service

Federal Public Service Mobility and Transport (French: Service public fédéral Mobilité et Transports, Dutch: Federale Overheidsdienst Mobiliteit en Vervoer, German: Föderaler Öffentlicher Dienst Mobilität und Transportwesen), is a Federal Public Service of Belgium.

Its head office is located at the City Atrium in the Brussels Northern Quarter business district.

It was created by Royal Order on 20 November 2001, as part of the plans of the Verhofstadt I Government to modernise the federal administration. It is responsible for preparing and implementing transportation policies.

The agency's Air Accident Investigation Unit (AAIU) investigates aircraft accidents and incidents. The agency's Railway Accident and Incident Investigation Unit investigates rail accidents. The Federal Bureau for the Investigation of Maritime Accidents (FEBIMA) investigates maritime accidents.

== Organisation ==
The FPS Mobility and Transport is currently organised into four Directorates-General:

- the Directorate-General Sustainable Mobility and Rail Policy
- the Directorate-General Road Transport and Road Safety
  - Vehicle registration service (DIV)
- the Directorate-General Shipping (DGS)
- the Belgian Civil Aviation Authority (BCAA)

It is also responsible for several government agencies, such as the Belgian Institute for Traffic Safety, and autonomous public companies, namely the National Railway Company of Belgium, the Brussels Airport Company and Skeyes.
