= Civil Aviation Authority of Mongolia =

Civil aviation agency of Mongolia

The Civil Aviation Authority of Mongolia (CAA; Mongolian: Иргэний нисэхийн ерөнхий газар) is the civil aviation agency of Mongolia. Its head office is in Ulaanbaatar.
