= Standardised European Rules of the Air =

Standardized European Rules of the Air (Commission Implementing Regulation (EU) No 923/2012) is a European regulation laying down the common rules of the air and operational provisions regarding services and procedures in air navigation issued on September 26, 2012. It was issued after the European Commission mandated Eurocontrol and EASA to harmonise the regulations between states.
