= Civil Aviation Authority of Fiji =

Agency overview
- Formed: 1999
- Jurisdiction: Government of Fiji
- Headquarters: Nadi Airport
- Ministers responsible: Aiyaz Sayed-Khaiyum, Attorney-General and Minister for Finance, Public Enterprises, Public Service, Communications and Civil Aviation; Sharvada Sharma, Solicitor General & (Acting)Permanent Secretary for Justice, Communications and Civil Aviation
- Agency executive: Ms. Theresa Levestam, Acting Chief Executive; Rigamoto Aisake, Controller Aviation Security and Facilitation; Theresa O'Boyle Levestam, Controller Ground Safety; Suresh Kumar, Acting Manager Corporate Services
- Parent agency: Ministry of Civil Aviation
- Website: www.caaf.org.fj

The Civil Aviation Authority of Fiji (CAAF) is the civil aviation authority in the Republic of Fiji and is responsible for discharging functions on behalf of the Government of Fiji under the States responsibility to the Convention on International Civil Aviation, also known as the Chicago Convention on International Civil Aviation Organization (ICAO). CAAF regulates the activities of airport operators, air traffic control and air navigation service providers, airline operators, pilots and air traffic controllers, aircraft engineers, technicians, airports, airline contracting organisations and international air cargo operators in Fiji.

The agency's head office is at Nadi Airport in Nadi.

== History of the 1999 CAAF Reform ==
Background to Reform

The reform of the Civil Aviation Authority of Fiji (CAAF) is a case which illustrates the impact of both political and trade union activities on the reform process. At the time of its reorganization in 1999, its employees were members of the Fiji Public Service Association (FPSA). Many of the CAAF workers were opposed to the restructuring plans and the job losses that were a central part of the reform.

The CAAF was a statutory body established by the CAAF Act of 1979. Apart from providing regulatory oversight for domestic civil aviation and fulfilling international air safety obligations, it also owned and managed Nadi International Airport, as well as managing the Nausori Airport near Suva and the 23 small domestic airports located on many islands with low populations. In addition, it provided aviation support services to the region.

The CAAF functioned like a government department, but had a mixture of statutory responsibilities and commercial obligations. Effectively, it was a referee and a player in its own game. For the 20 years prior to the restructuring, it had been making annual profits. This was largely because its annual revenue growth was directly linked to the expansion of the international tourism industry in Fiji. Income was derived from landing and parking fees, air navigation charges, passenger service charges, terminal building concessions and rentals, fuel concessions, and the sale of excess power. It was exempt from income tax until the reform. Only minor investments were made into infrastructure. It received heavy financial assistance in the form of an annual government grant to run Nausori airport and the other loss-making airports.

Yet the government realised that the CAAF was inefficient, overstaffed and overburdened by bureaucracy. Its staff members' unions were in constant dispute with the management and the unions strongly resisted any changes to work practices. Two reviews of the CAAF had recommended non-core activities be divested to other organisations. In the late 1990s, processes were introduced to improve efficiency through a continuous quality improvement programme.

Division into Statutory Authority and Company

In April 1997, the then Minister for Public Enterprises, Isimeli Bose announced that the CAAF was to be declared a "commercial statutory authority" and, in May, he said it would be reorganised pursuant to provisions of the public enterprise reform legislation. Subsequently, a reorganisation charter was prepared. The principal objective of the reorganisation was to increase the CAAF's efficiency and rate of return on assets, while at the same time providing an efficient regulatory function that meets international civil aviation standards (MCICP 1998c).

The reorganisation, facilitated by the Civil Aviation Reform Act 1999, involved separating the CAAF's regulatory role from its commercial operations. The commercial responsibilities and assets were transferred to a new company, Airports Fiji Ltd (AFL), which was established as a "government commercial company". It was incorporated under the Companies Act and required to operate along commercial lines, with clearly defined profitability targets and with new terms and conditions of employment. The main functions prescribed were the provision of air traffic management in Fiji and its flight information region; the management of airport commercial assets (the aerodromes, terminal buildings, commercial properties and infrastructure necessary for commercial activities); and the administration and management of airports as commercial businesses.

The CAAF's regulatory role was given to a newly formed regulatory organisation called the Civil Aviation Authority of the Fiji Islands (CAAFI). The CAAFI's functions, as provided under the Civil Aviation Reform Act, include civil aviation regulation and international civil aviation obligations, along with safety oversight and safety education responsibilities for all airports, airlines, airport operations, and personnel. It oversees the activities of airport operators, air traffic control and air navigation service providers, and aircraft operators. It also has the responsibility for disposing of assets not required by AFL and for managing a housing estate (with over 150 residential sites) and other properties. In addition, it has a 51 percent shareholding in Air Terminal Services (Fiji) Ltd which provides ground handling services, including passenger handling, aircraft engineering, and in-flight catering. The implementation of the reform occurred in early April 1999, during the campaign for the May 1999 national elections. The approach adopted to transfer staff from CAAF to the two new organisations resulted in chaos. CAAF staff were terminated and paid their retirement gratuity and recreation leave entitlements. Many excess CAAF employees were offered redundancy packages and resigned.

== Current Structure of CAAF ==
The CAAF is divided into the following sections:

- Aviation Security and Facilitation Department
- Air Safety Department
- Ground safety Department
- Personnel Licensing Office
- Corporate Services Department

== ANR Batch 1 (2003) Amendment ==
In 2003, Cabinet approved the promulgation of the Air Navigation (Amendment) Regulations 2003. Cabinet based its decision on a submission by the Minister for Transport and Civil Aviation, Josefa Vosanibola, who said that new regulations were needed to cater for changes in the aviation industry. “The aviation industry has gone through rapid changes in the last few years to respond to the needs of the market,” Mr Vosanibola said. He said the services that were normally provided by a state authority had been divided up among various corporations to bring about efficiency in the industry. The Minister said this division of responsibilities among profit making corporations required government to enact appropriate legislation to ensure that the safety of civil aviation was not compromised by commercial considerations. “The amendments also cover operational, safety and health issues arising from the acquisition of larger aircraft by Air Pacific,” he said. These included the manning of emergency doors on twin deck aircraft, and the need to ensure that the crew on these aircraft had adequate rest. Mr Vosanibola said the amended Regulations also return to CAAFI (Civil Aviation Authority of the Fiji Islands) some regulatory powers that were inadvertently passed on to Airports Fiji Limited by the Civil Aviation Reform Act, 1999. A total of 49 Regulations were amended to comply with safety standards and recommended practices introduced by the ICAO (International Civil Aviation Organization). These included Certification of Service Providers; Regulatory Functions; Airworthiness of Aircraft; Licensing; and Flight Operations and Rules of the Air. A transition period of six months from the date of promulgation was provided to allow stakeholders to comply with the amended Regulations.
