= Belgian Civil Aviation Authority =

Belgian aviation agency

The Belgian Civil Aviation Authority (also known as "Direction générale du Transport aérien" (DGTA) in French, or "Directoraat-generaal Luchtvaart" (DGLV) in Dutch) is part of the FPS Mobility and Transport in Belgium, the acting director-general of the BCAA is Emmanuelle Vandamme .
The BCAA is responsible for Licensing, International and EU Affairs, Quality Services, Company Approvals, Airspace and Airports and Air Navigation Services in Belgium.

== Aircraft accidents and incidents investigation ==
In Belgium, civil aviation accidents are investigated by the Belgian Civil Aviation Authority (Federal Public Service Mobility and Transport – Belgian Civil Aviation Authority (BCAA) –Air Accident Investigation Unit) – with the full cooperation of the airline and other interested parties. This unit is functionally separated from the BCAA.

No airline representative can speculate publicly on the cause of the accident because only the Belgian Civil Aviation Authority (BCAA) and its professional investigators can determine the "probable cause".

Airlines involved in the accident stand ready to support any investigation, with an accident team prepared to fly to an accident scene on short notice. These teams include specialists in such areas as safety, flight, maintenance and emergency procedures.

With these experts assisting, the Belgian Civil Aviation Authority (BCAA) will examine the accident scene, interview witnesses, analyse cockpit and data recorders from the airplane, and, if necessary, conduct a public hearing.

Because of the complexity of modern aircraft and the multitude of factors that can contribute to an accident, an investigation can take months, even years, to complete.

Given the need for careful analysis, it is irresponsible for airline representatives or others to rush judgements on the cause of the accident/incident before a methodical investigation is completed.

Accident investigation reports have been made public on the department's website.

== Pilot licensing ==
Until 2009, most Belgian pilot's licenses were managed at Joint Aviation Requirements (JAR) level, and were issued and maintained by the BCAA on behalf of Joint Aviation Authorities: Private Pilot License, Commercial Pilot Licence, ATPL. Some types of license were not under JAR control, and these were issued by the BCAA under its own authority: ultralight, balloon. Glider licensing is delegated to regional federations.

Since 2009 the European Union Aviation Safety Agency replaces JAR.
