= Civil Aviation Safety Authority (Papua New Guinea) =

The Civil Aviation Safety Authority (CASA PNG) is the civil aviation authority of Papua New Guinea. Its head office is in Six Mile, National Capital District, with a Boroko P.O. Box.

== See also ==
- Papua New Guinea Accident Investigation Commission
