= Vehicle license plates of the United States =

United States
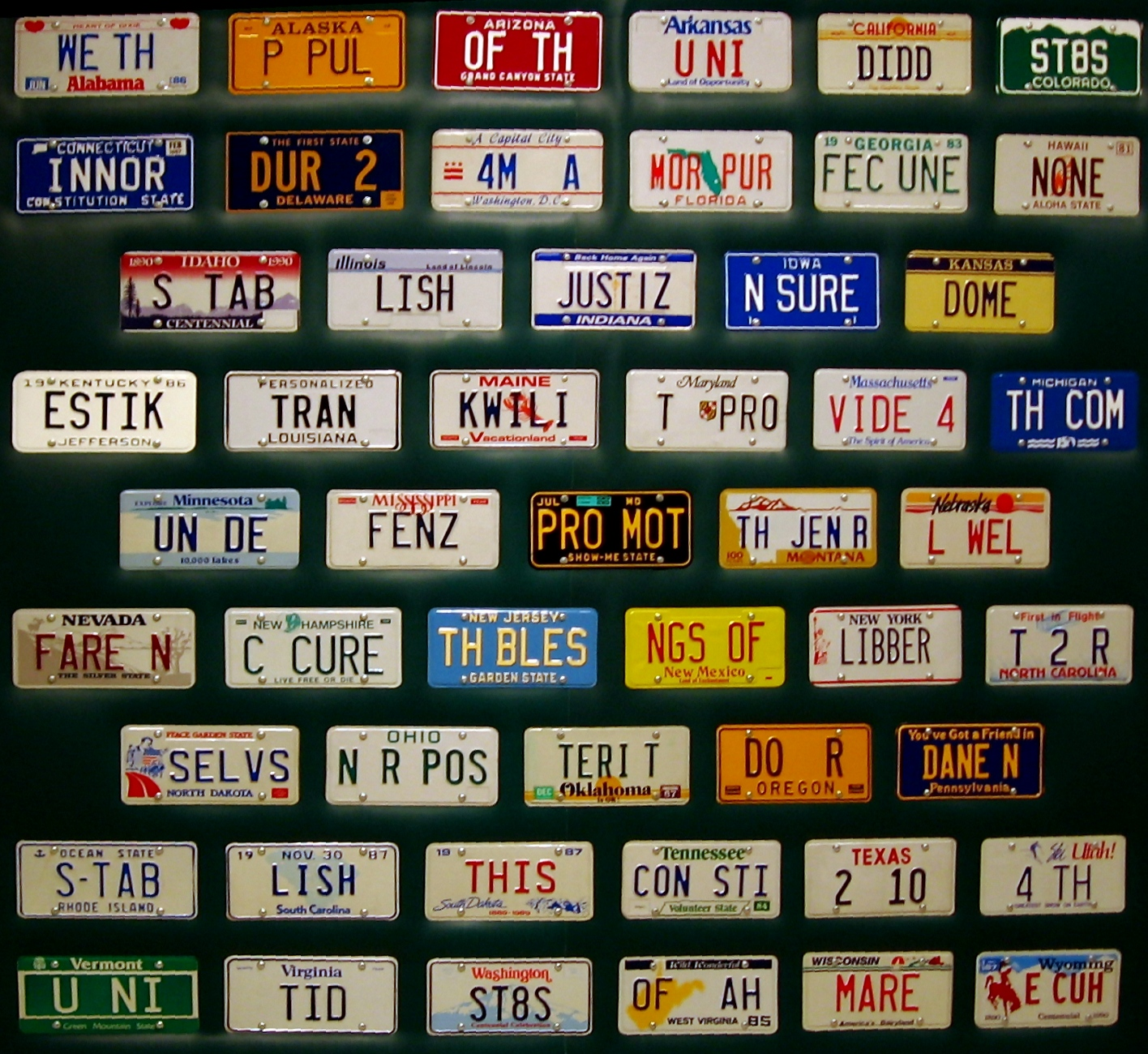
- A sample of various regular license plates issued across the United States.
- Country: United States
- Country code: USA

Current series
- Size: 12 in × 6 in 300 mm × 150 mm
- Serial format: Not standard

In the United States, vehicle registration plates, known as license plates, are issued by a department of motor vehicles, an agency of the state or territorial government, or in the case of the District of Columbia, the district government. Some Native American tribes also issue plates. The U.S. federal government issues plates only for its own vehicle fleet and for vehicles owned by foreign diplomats. Prior to 1984, diplomatic plates were issued by jurisdiction, meaning that the District of Columbia was responsible for all foreign embassies in the United States, and the state of New York for all foreign missions accredited to the United Nations.

The appearances of plates are frequently chosen to contain symbols, colors, or slogans associated with the issuing jurisdiction. The term license plate is frequently used in statutes, although in some areas tag is informally used. The official three letter DSIT (coinciding with its ISO code) international code attributed to the United States is USA.

As of 2014, the federal government and forty states use prison labor to produce their license plates.

== Designs and serial formats ==
Gallery of current standard issue license plates
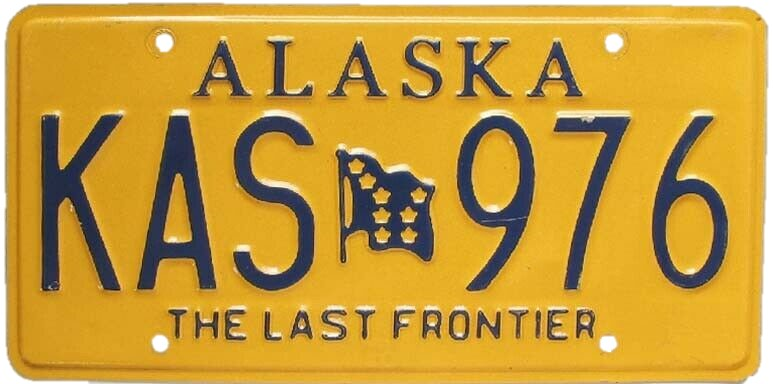
Alaska

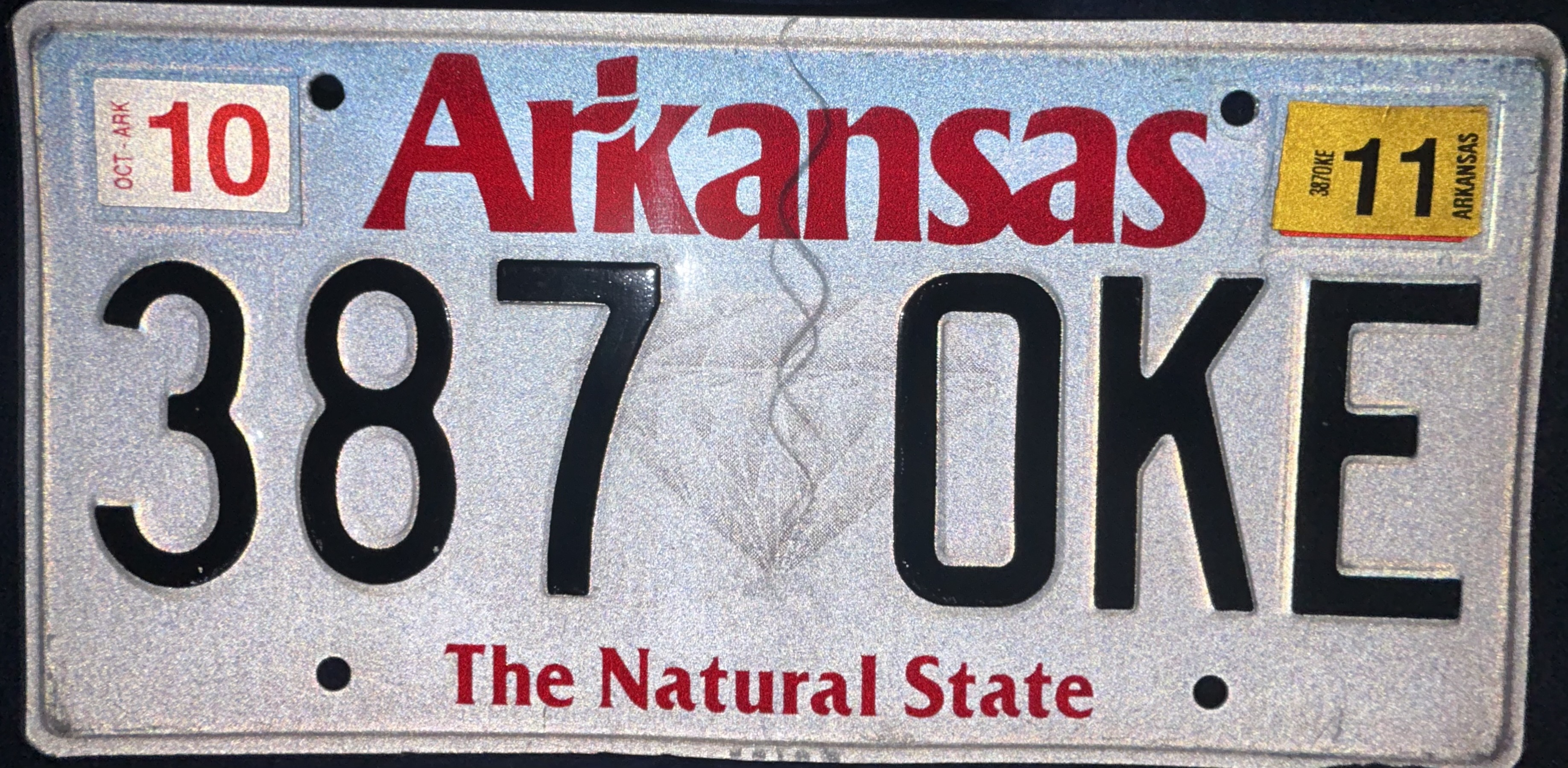
Arkansas

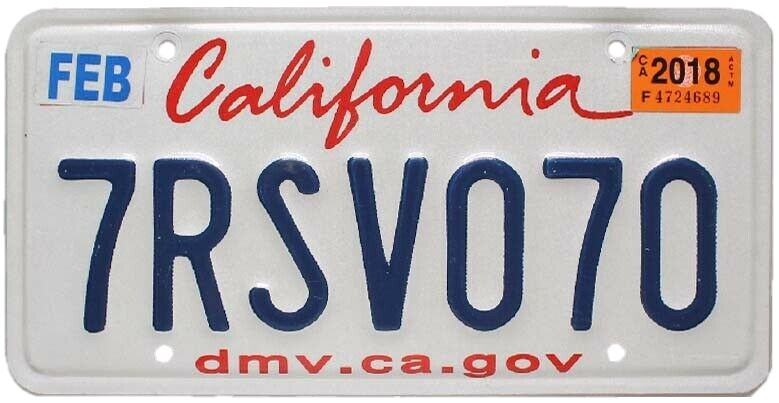
California

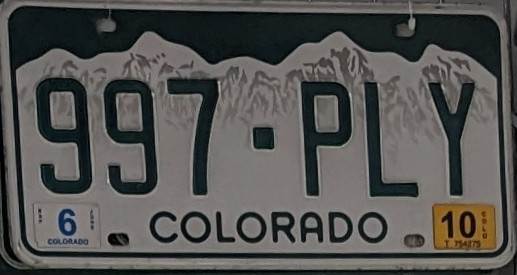
Colorado

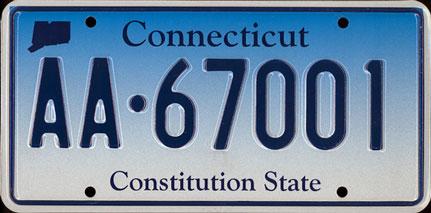
Connecticut

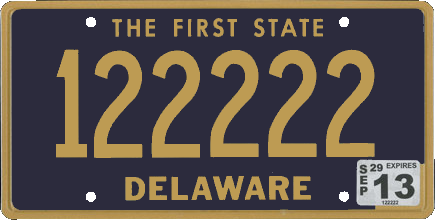
Delaware

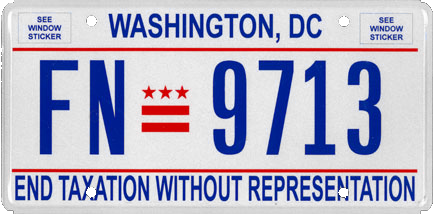
District of Columbia

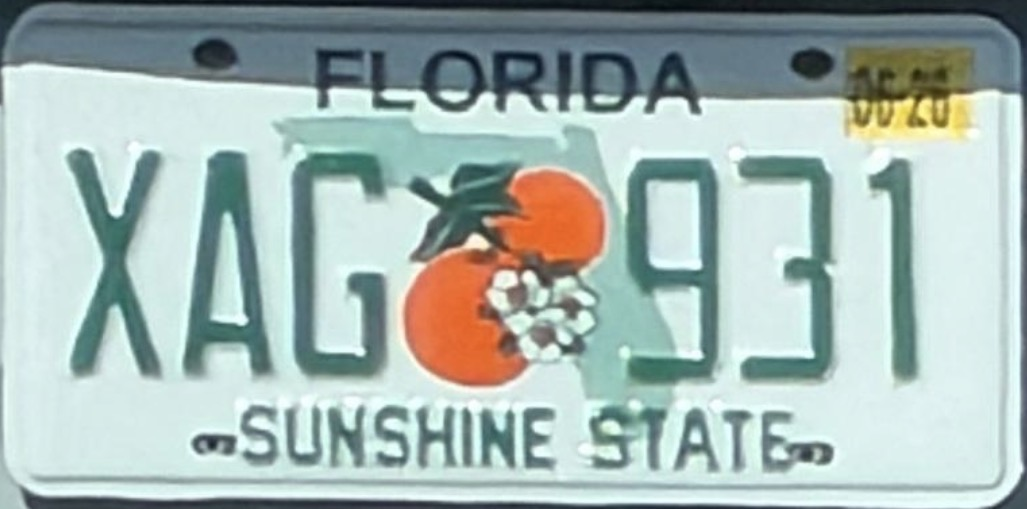
Florida

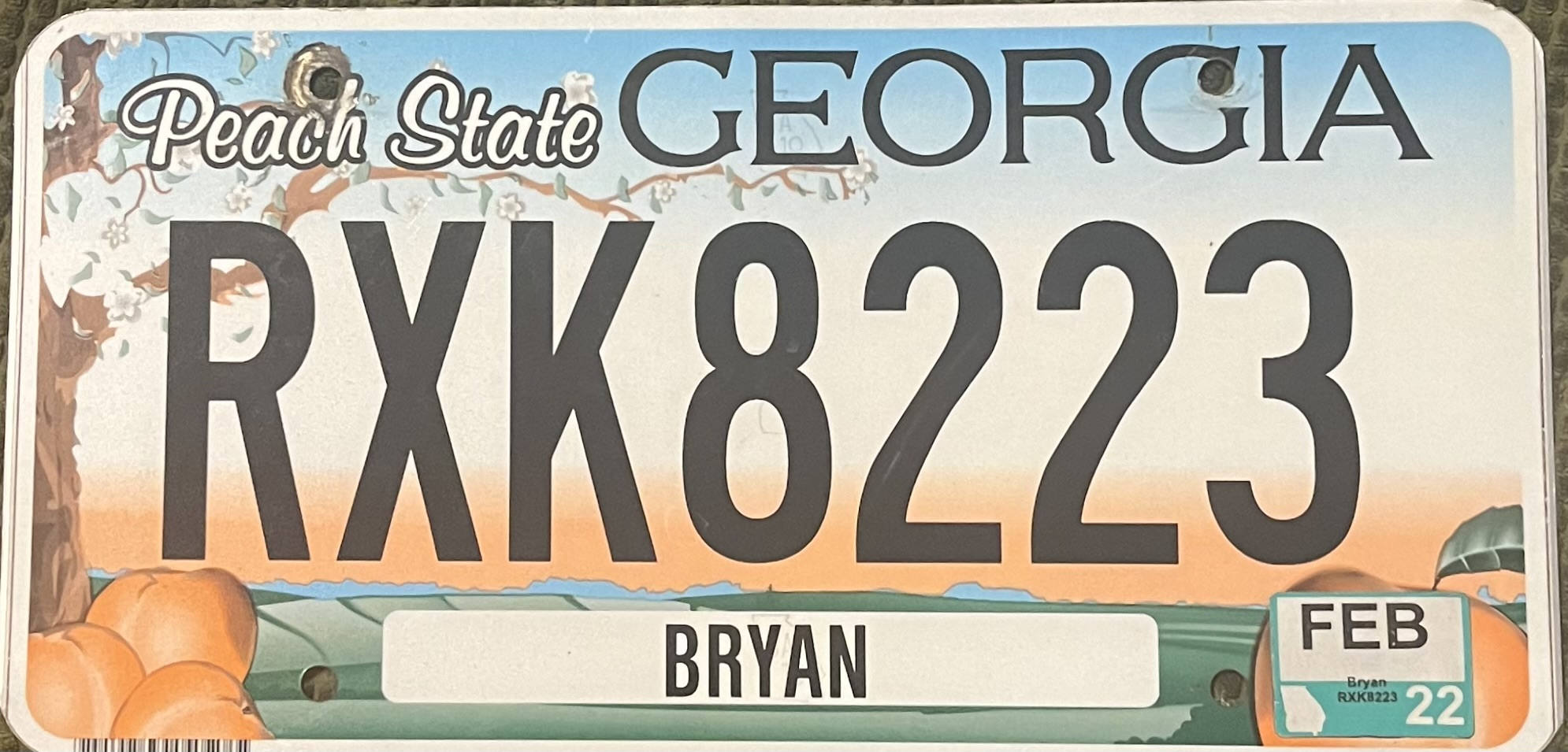
Georgia

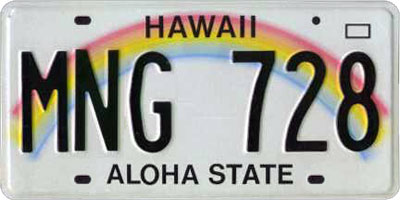
Hawaii

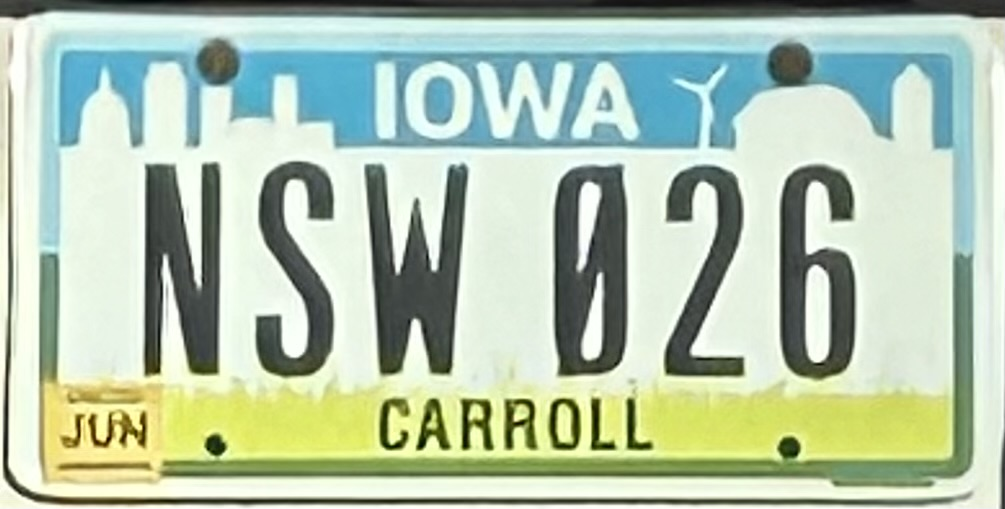
Iowa

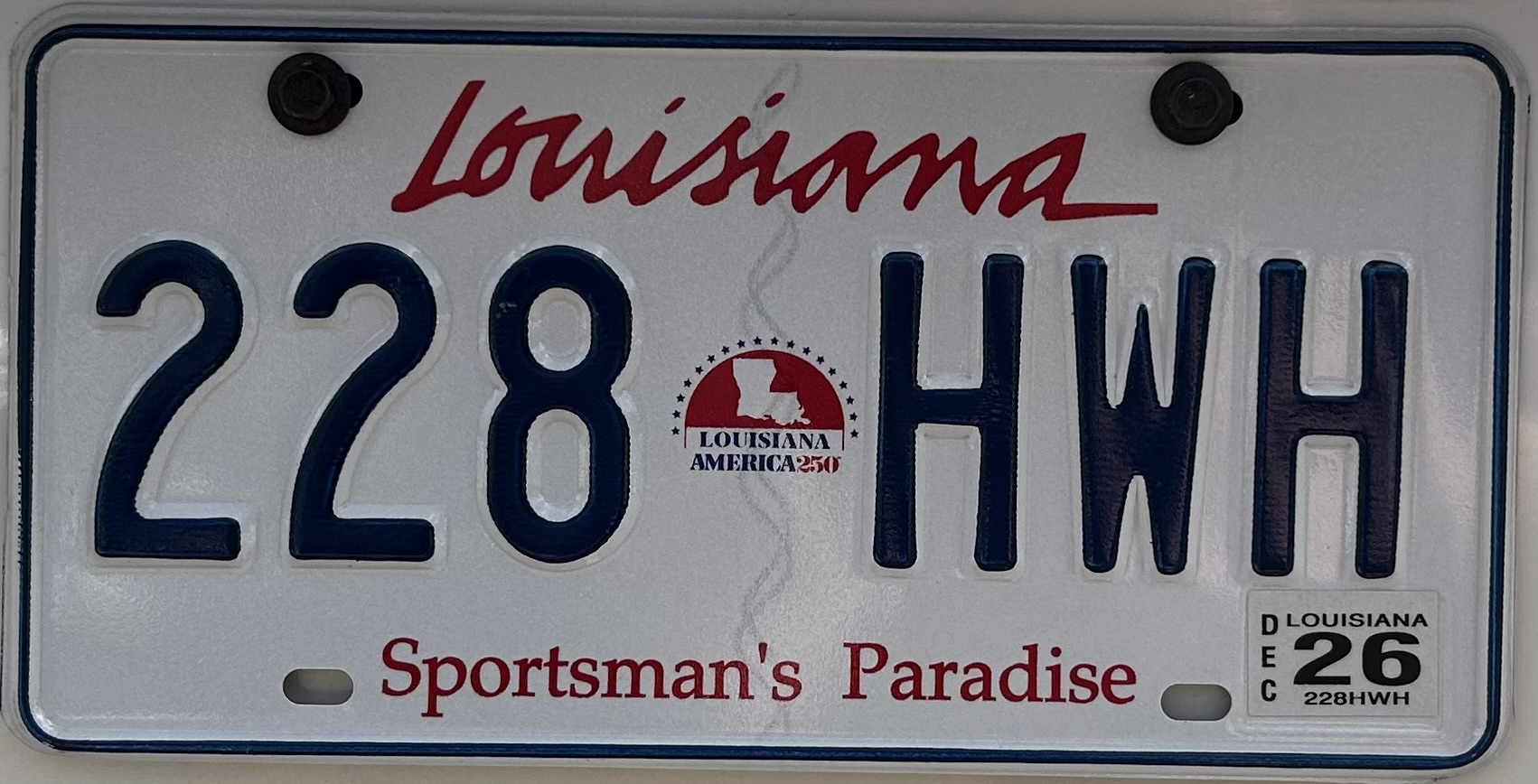
Louisiana

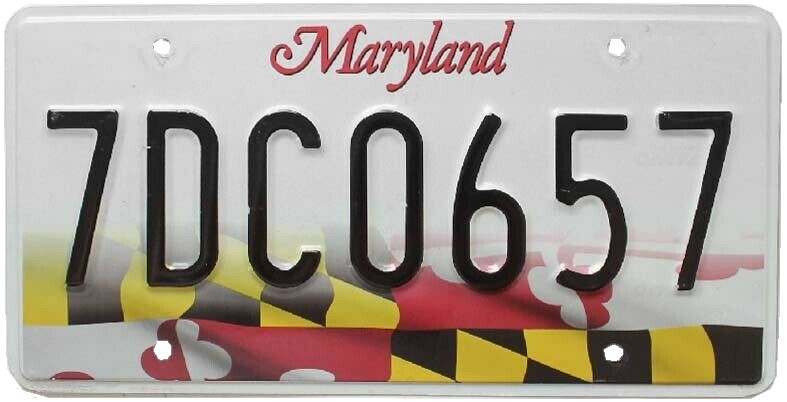
Maryland

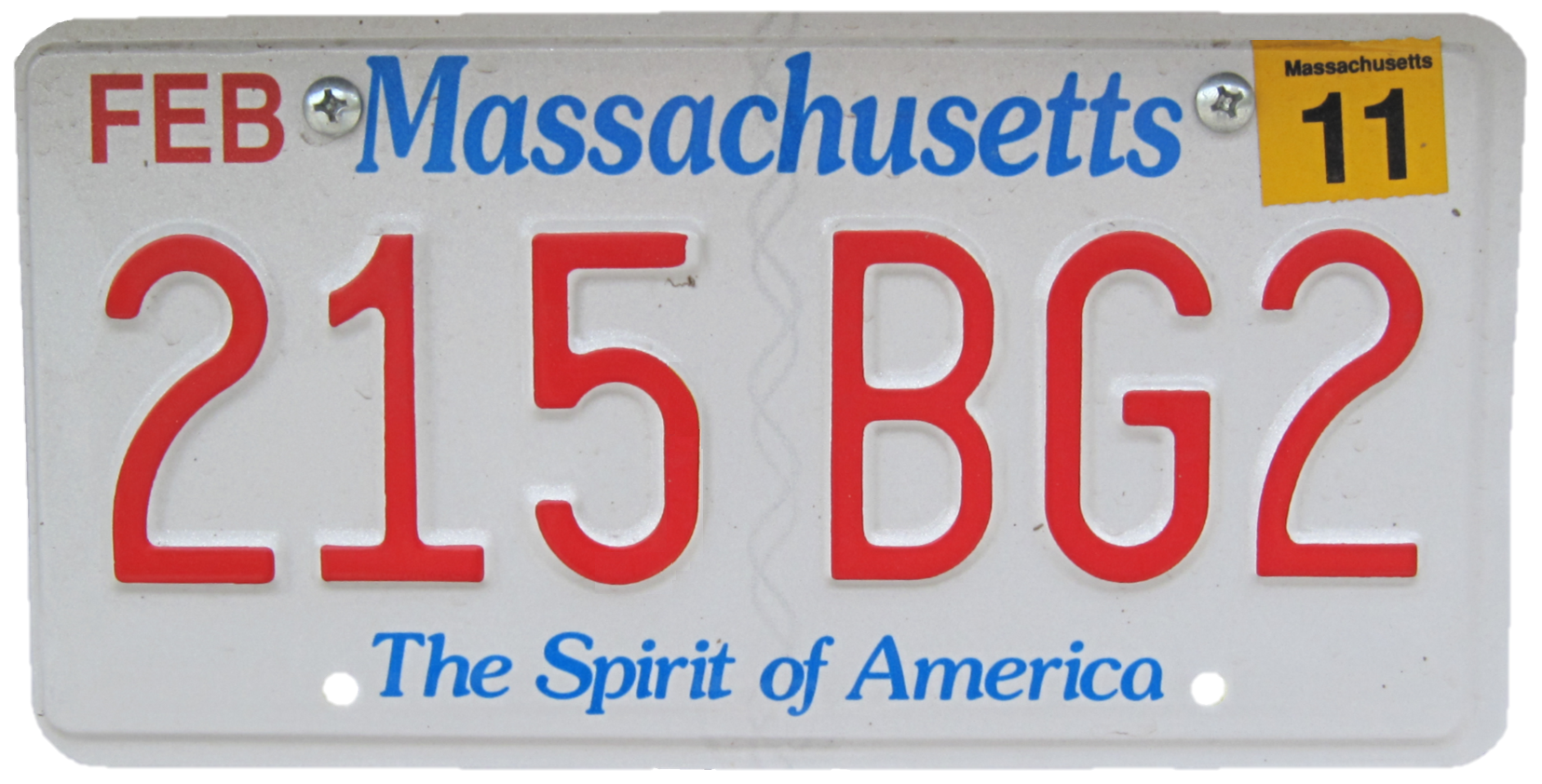
Massachusetts

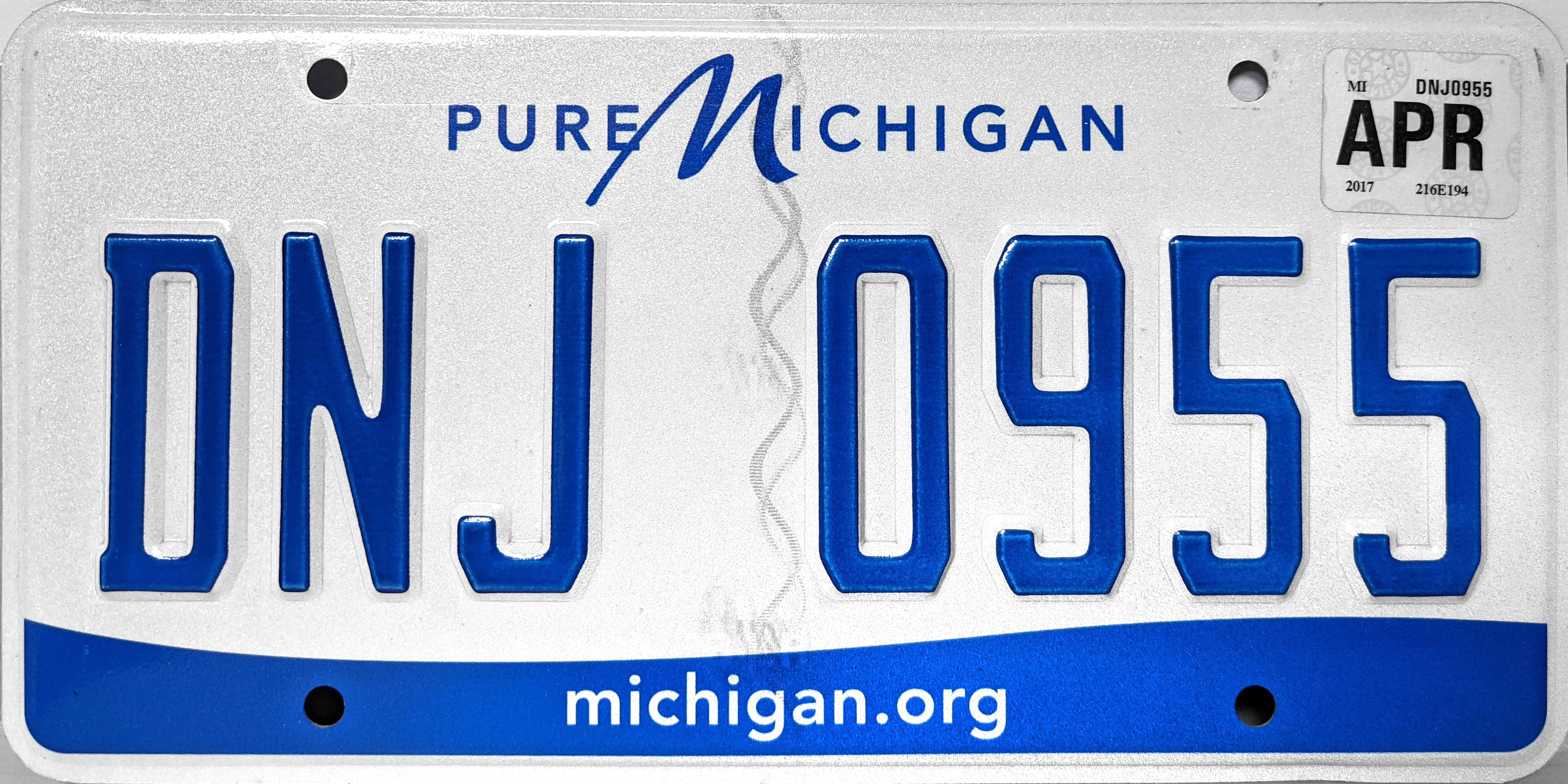
Michigan

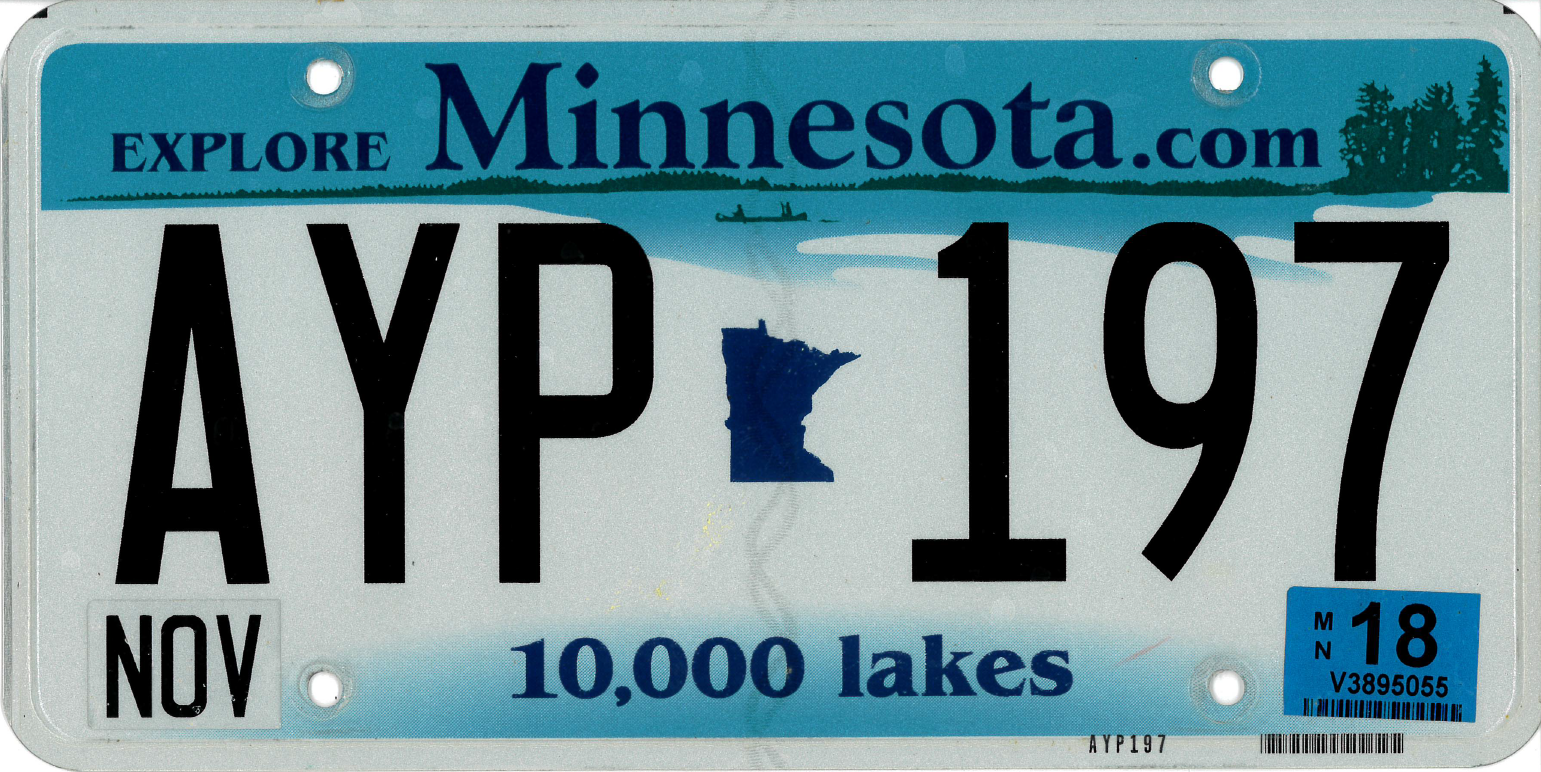
Minnesota

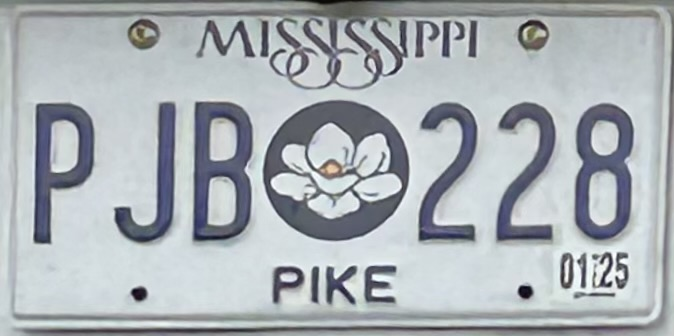
Mississippi

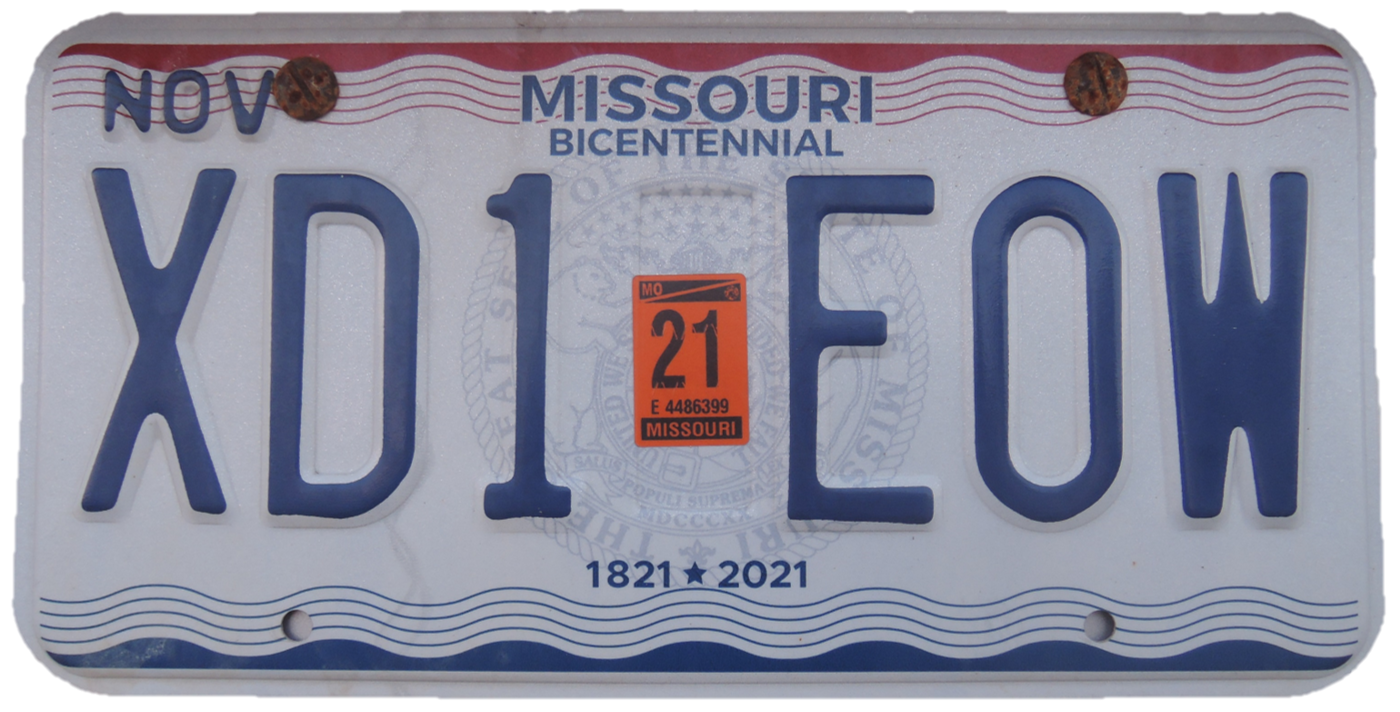
Missouri

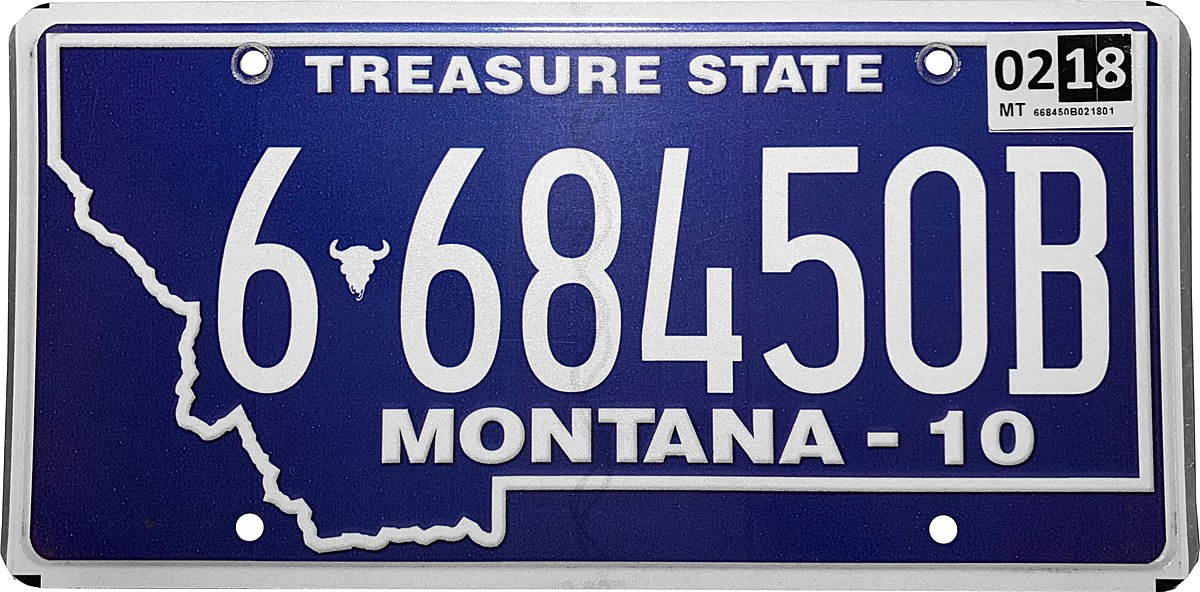
Montana

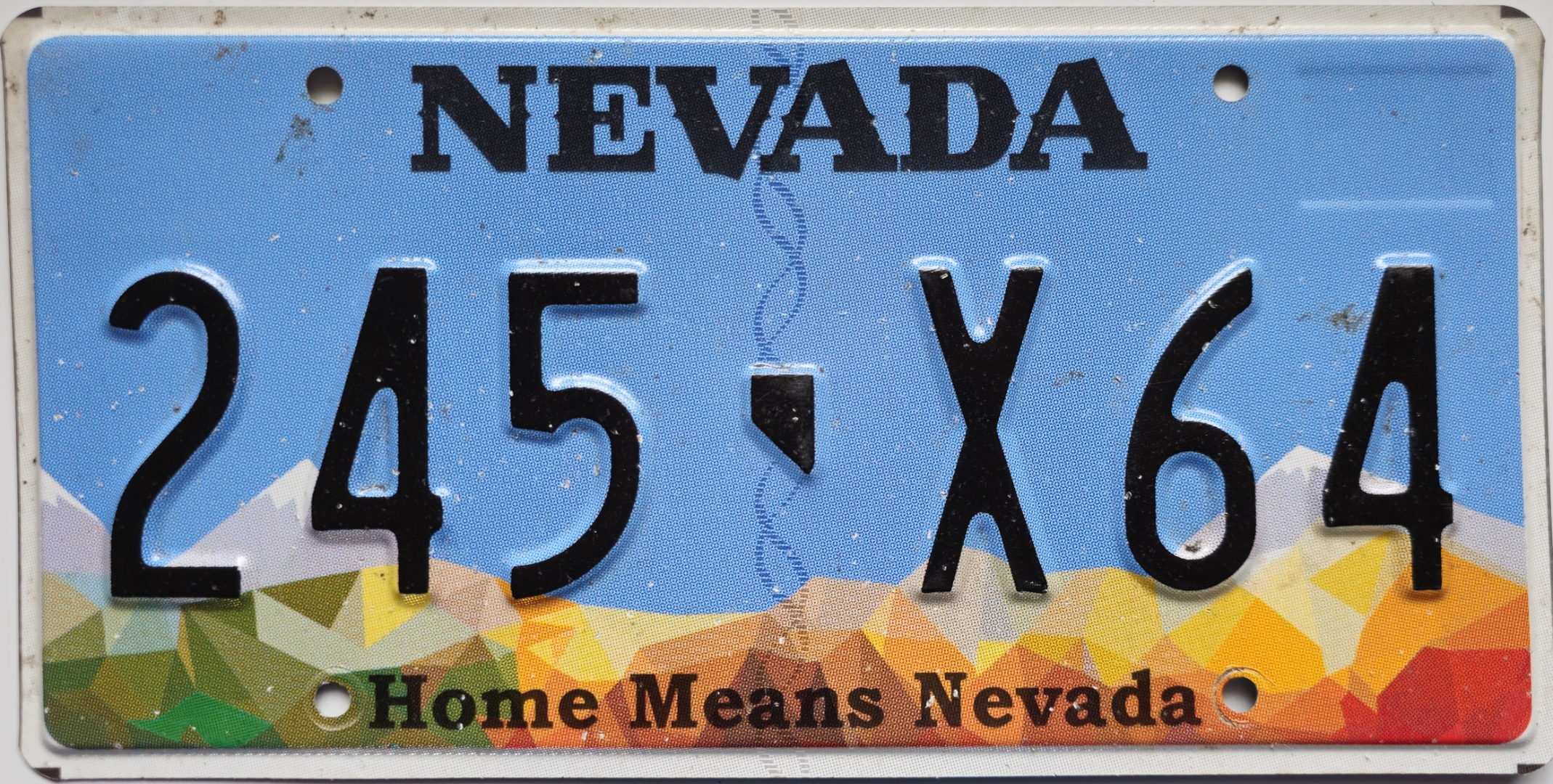
Nevada

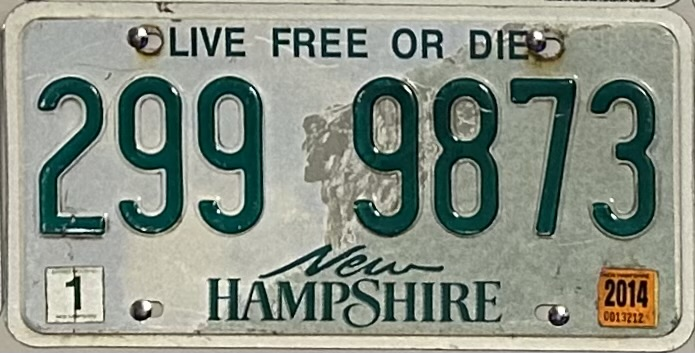
New Hampshire

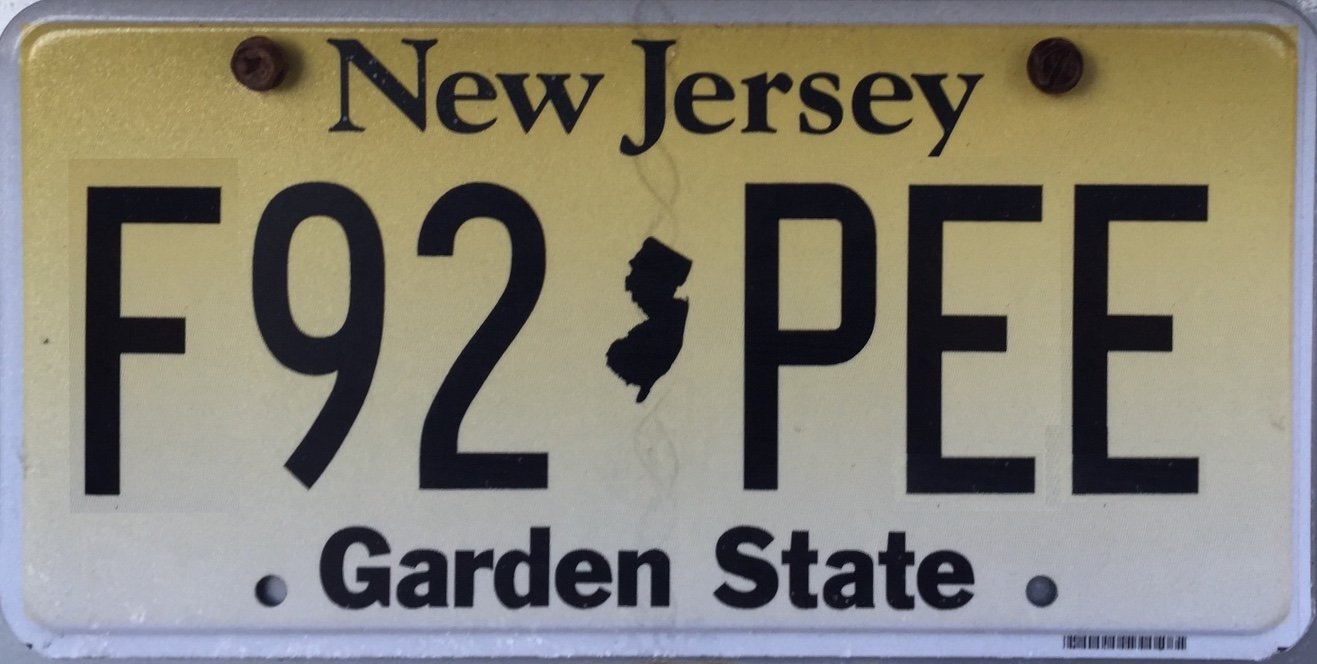
New Jersey

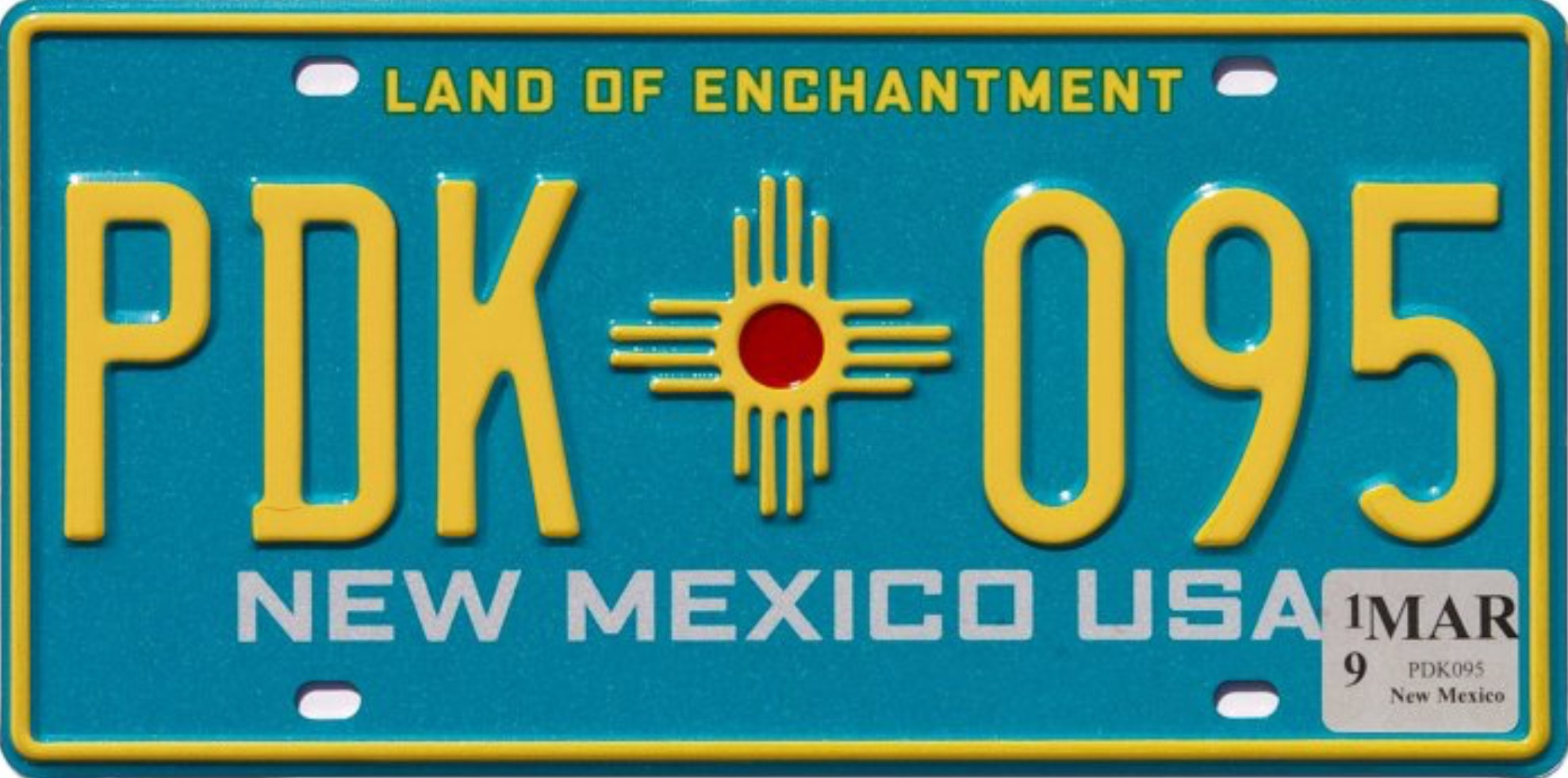
New Mexico

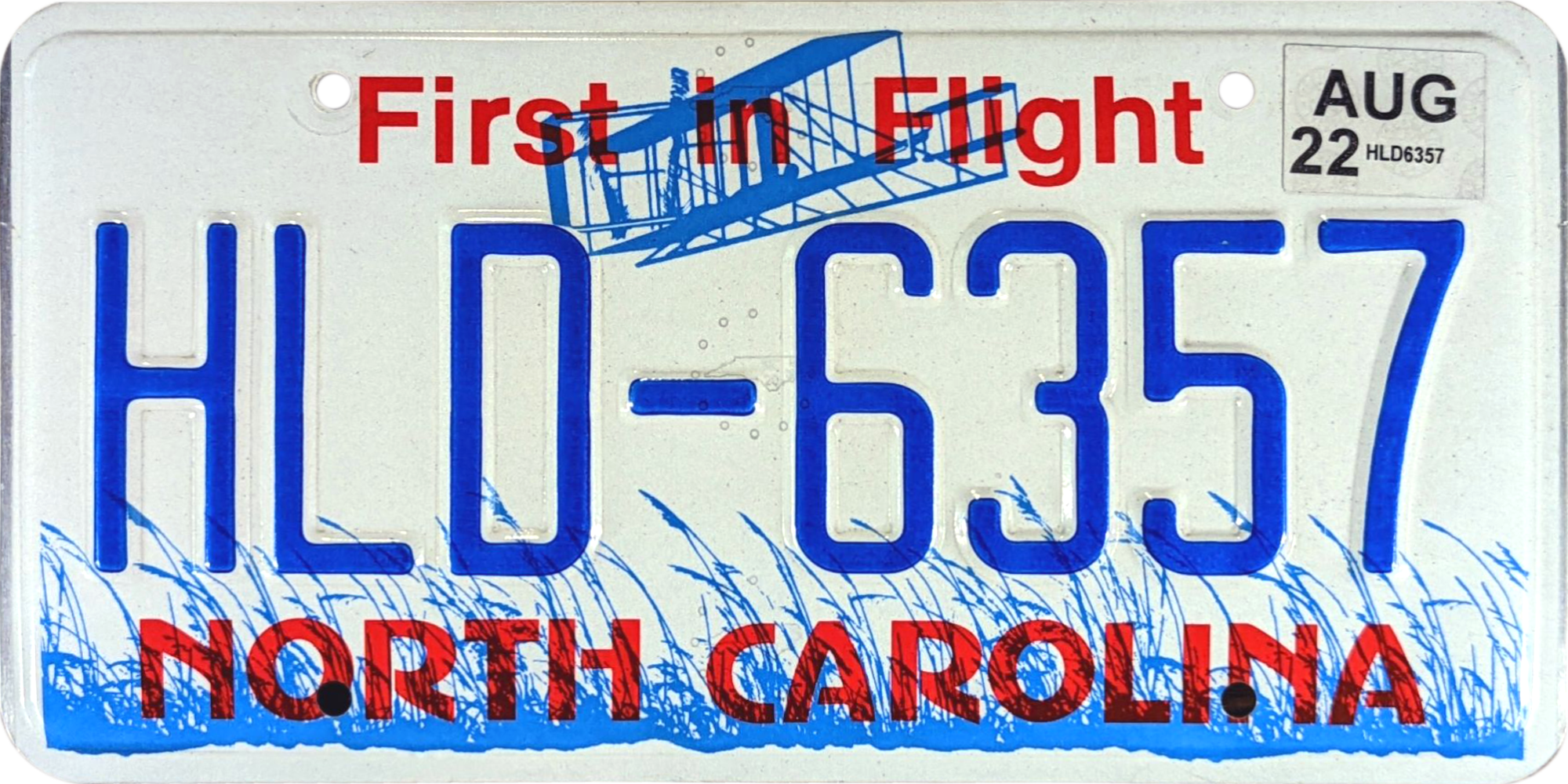
North Carolina

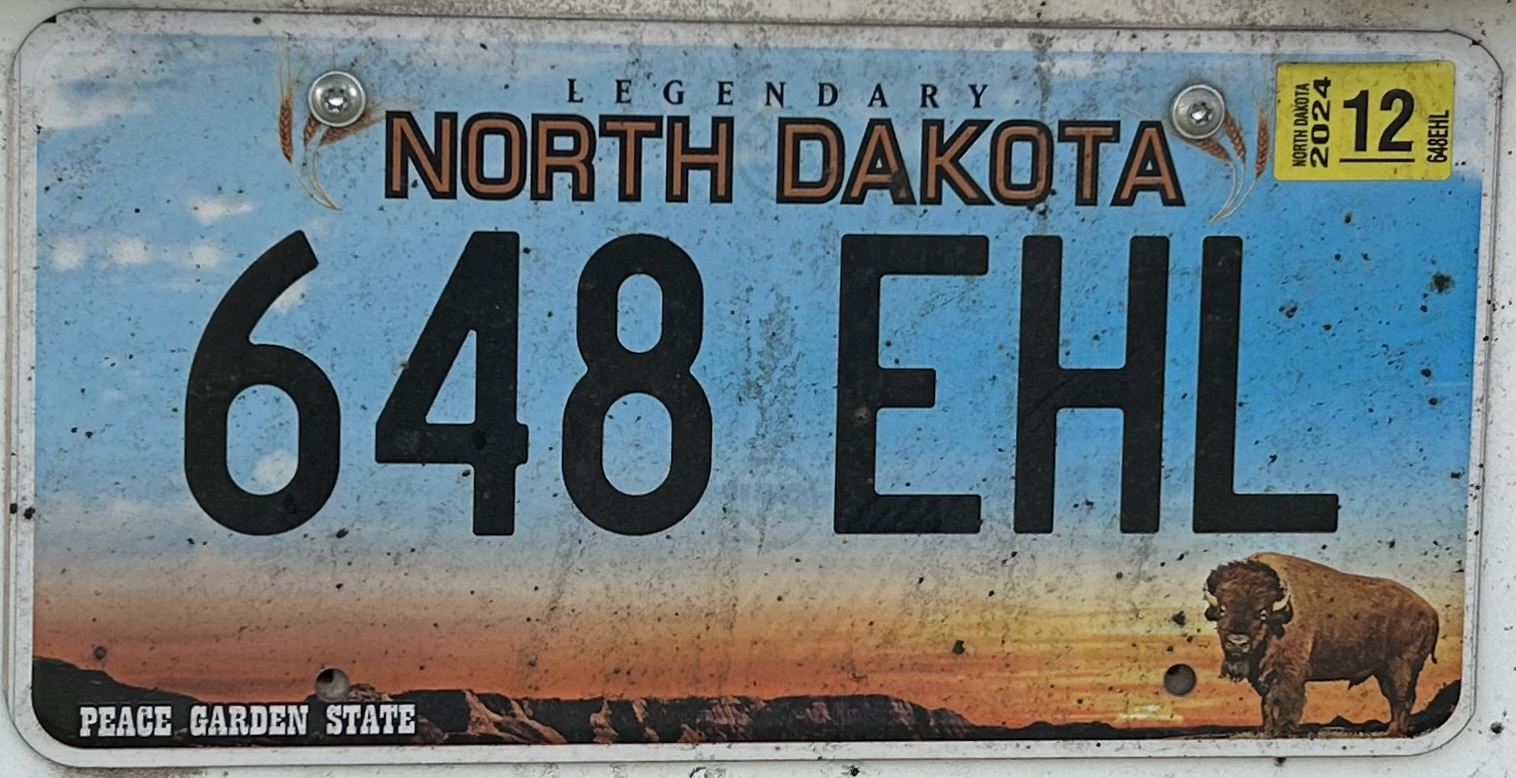
North Dakota

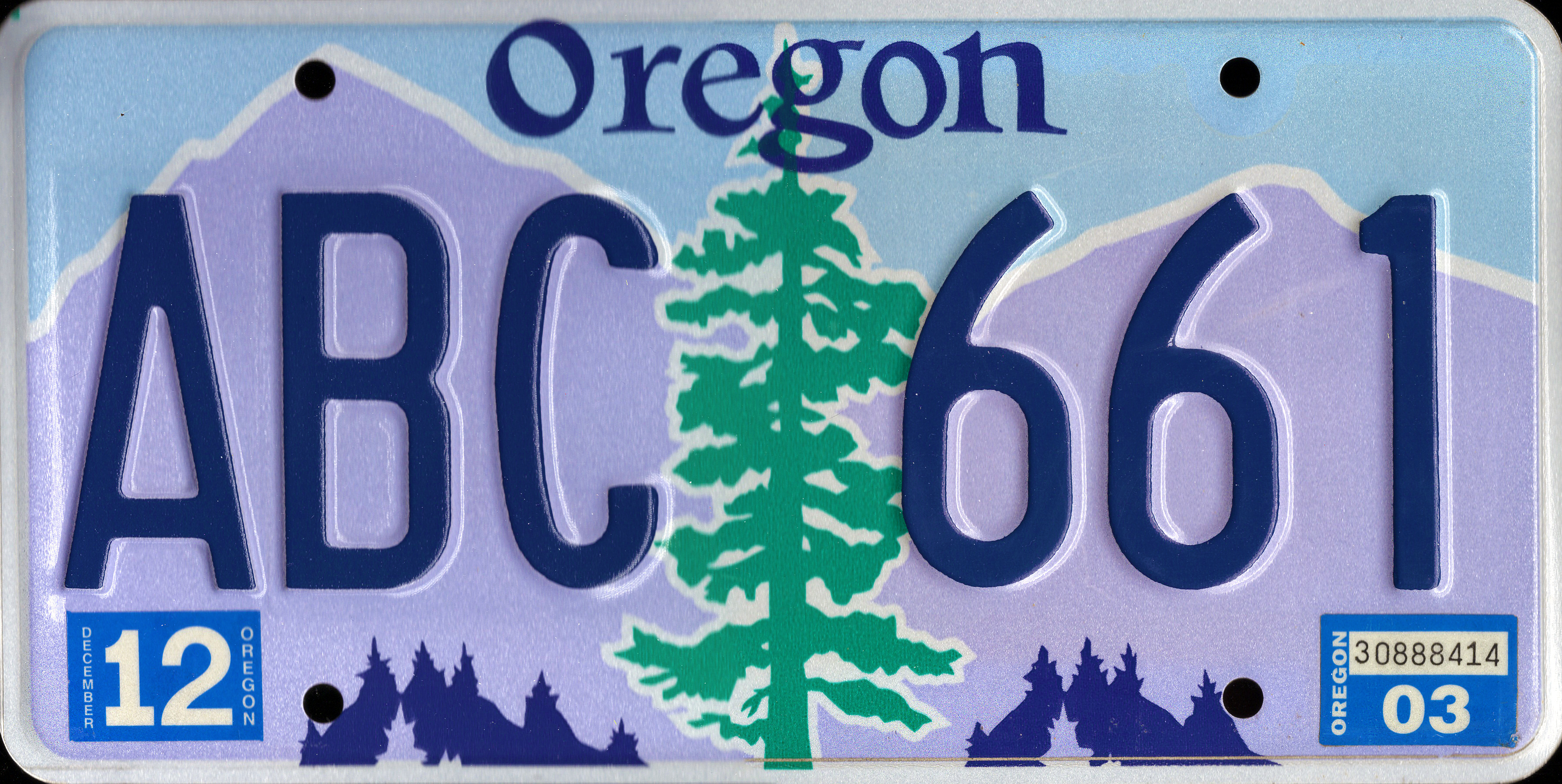
Oregon

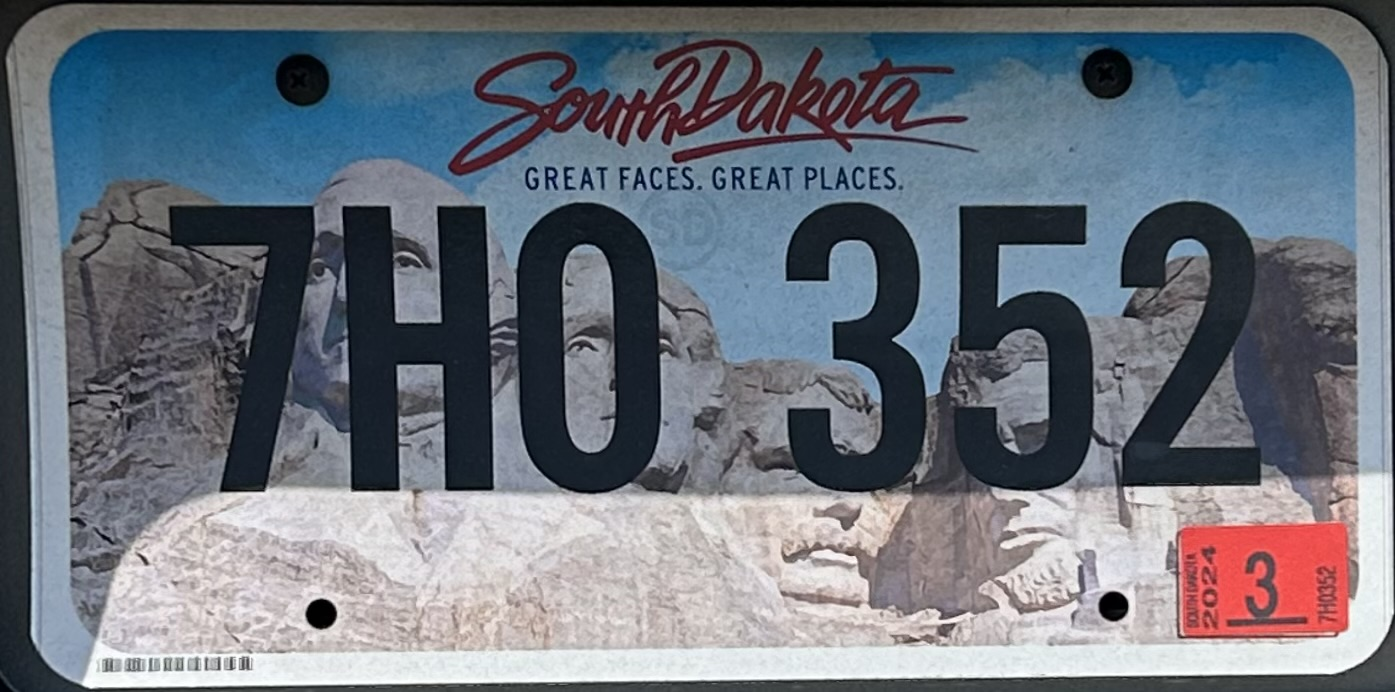
South Dakota

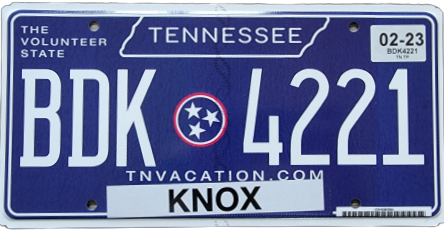
Tennessee

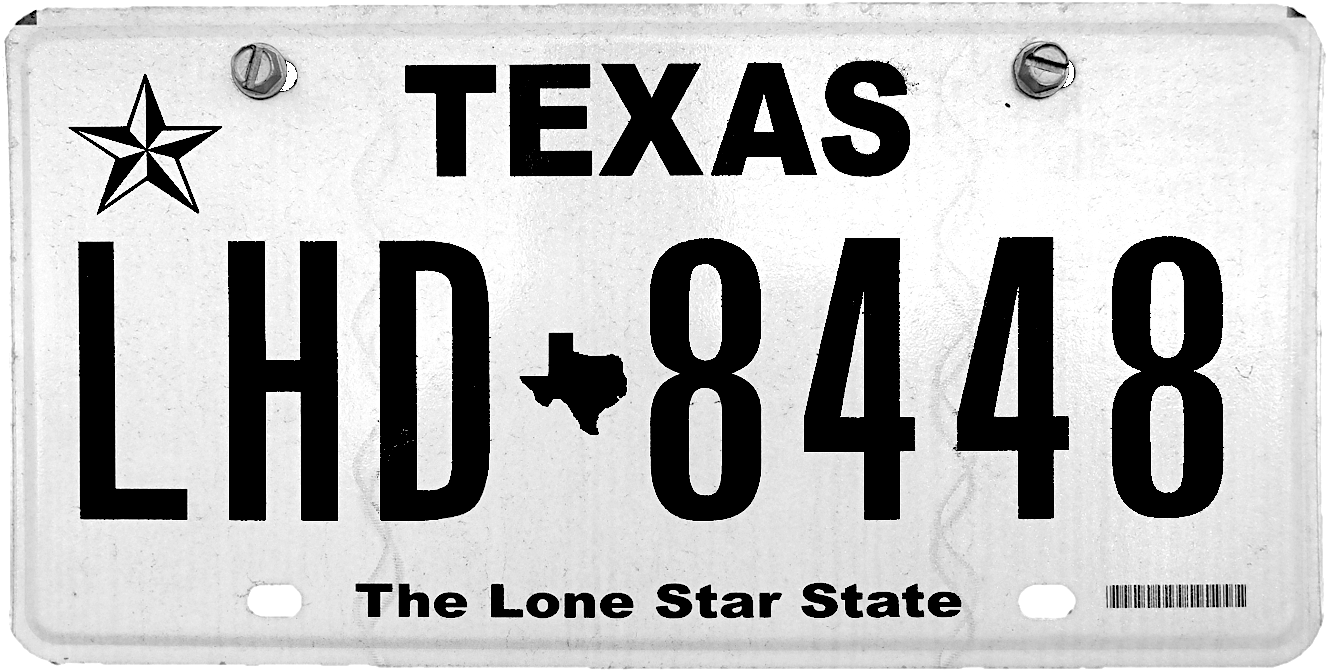
Texas

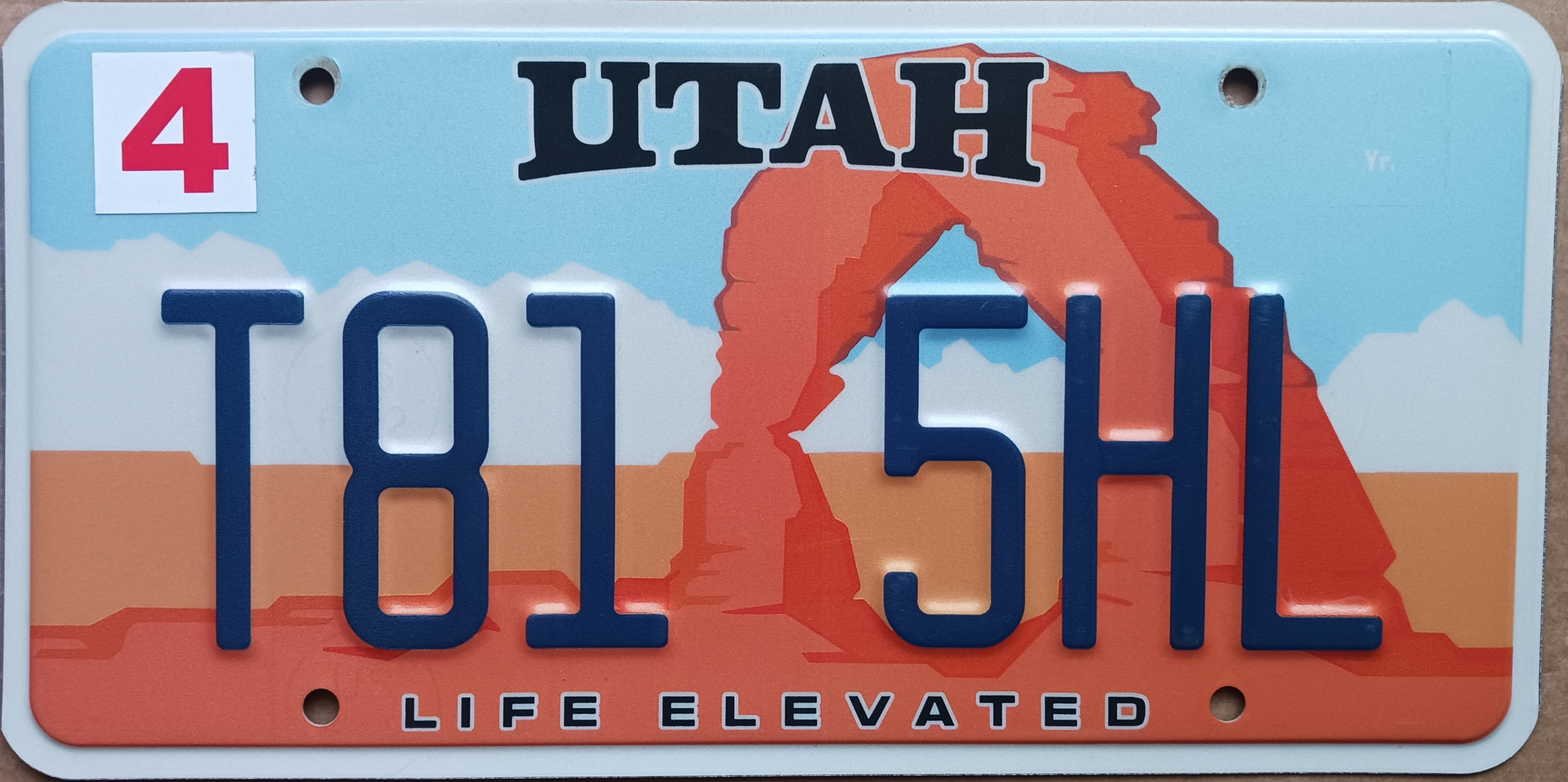
Utah

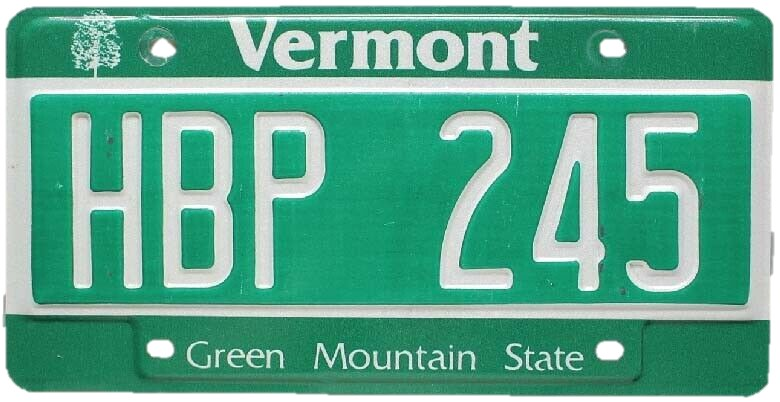
Vermont

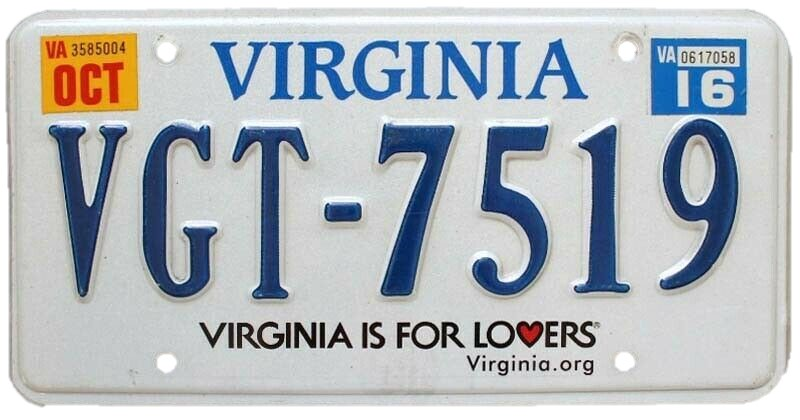
Virginia

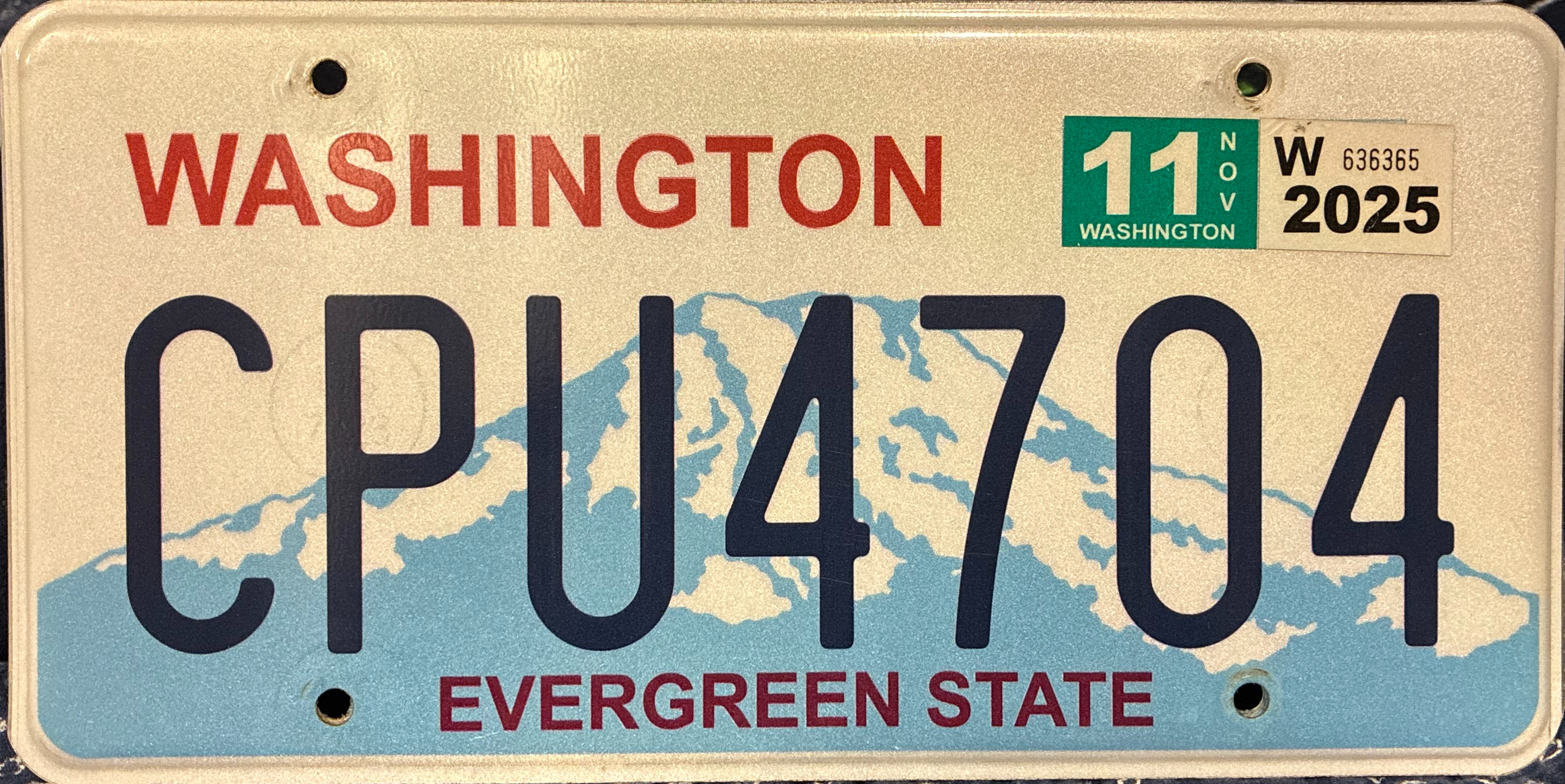
Washington

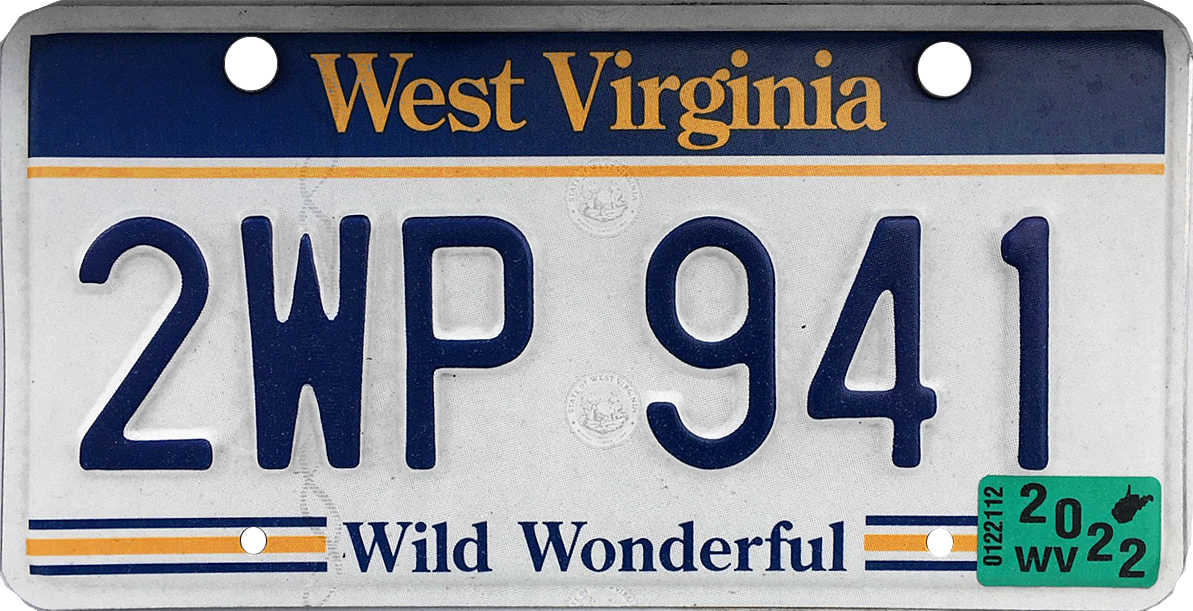
West Virginia

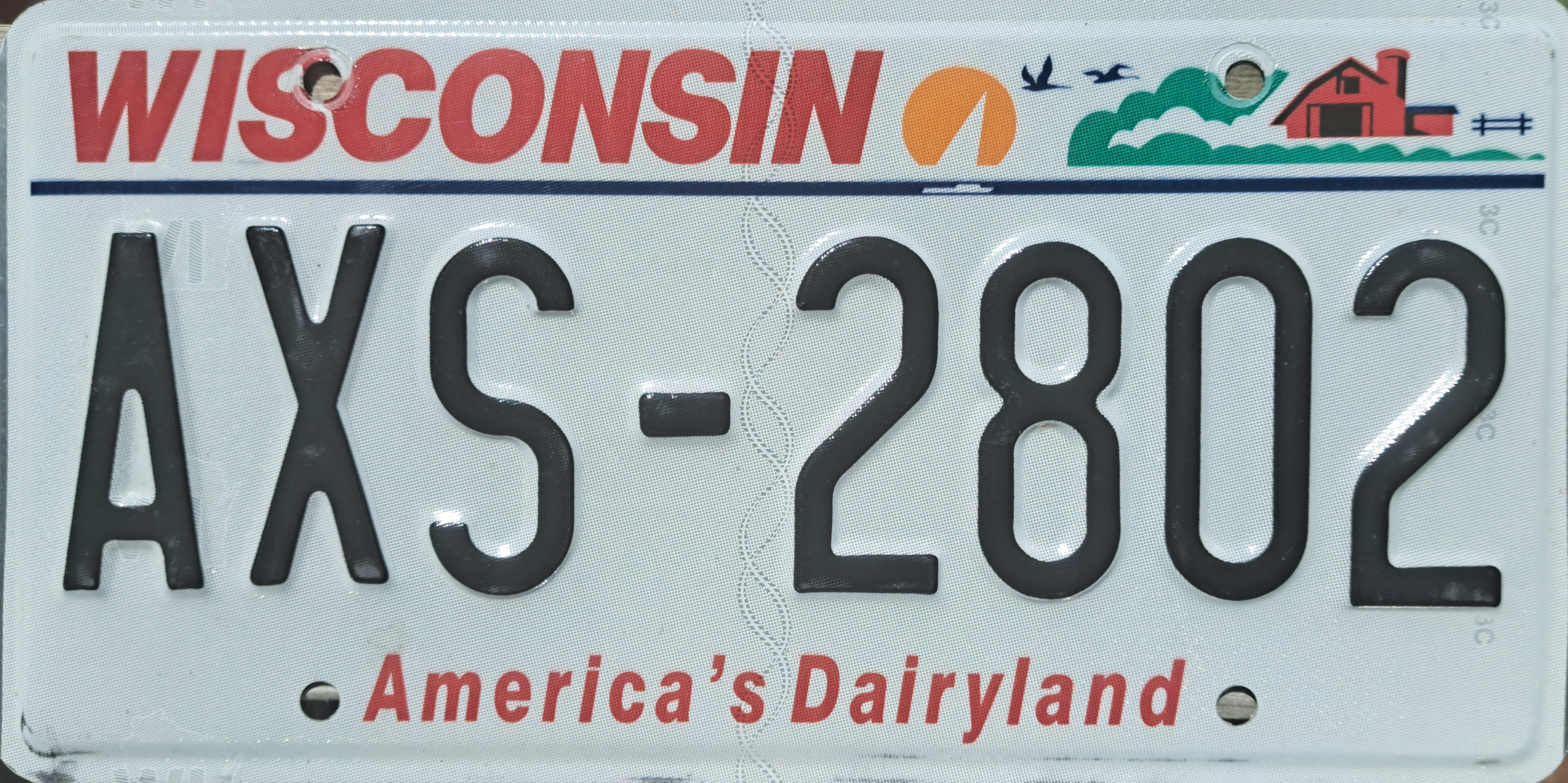
Wisconsin

=== Serial formats ===
Plate designs often contain symbols, colors, or slogans associated with the issuing jurisdiction. Registration number formats, typically alphanumeric, are designed to provide enough unique numbers for all motor vehicles a jurisdiction expects to register. For example, the small states of Delaware and Rhode Island are able to use formats of 123456, while more populated states (such as New York) use the format ABC-1234. Other examples of seven-character serial formats are 123ABC4 (used by California), AB-12345 (used by Connecticut and Illinois), 1234ABC (used by Kansas), and 1AB2345 (used by Maryland). Many states with smaller populations use a three-letter/three-number format, such as ABC-123 or 123-ABC. Arkansas, Colorado, Florida, and New Jersey use a four-letter/two-number format, while Rhode Island and the District of Columbia use two letters and four numbers. Nevada uses one letter and five numbers. Arizona uses an "alphabet soup" format of six-character alphanumeric combinations. Other formats include those that incorporate a county coding system (e.g. Idaho) or a month of expiration into the plate number (e.g. Massachusetts).

Non-passenger vehicle plates (such as commercial and government-owned vehicles, trucks, and trailers) tend to have separate designs, including special numbering formats.

=== Designs ===
In the United States, many states distinguish their license plates through distinctive color schemes and logos, which persist over time. For example, the cowboy logo often associated with the state of Wyoming has appeared on that state's license plates continuously since 1936. Some early Tennessee plates were produced in a parallelogram shape approximating that of the state. The outline of Tennessee is carried on in their current license plates, along with the three-star emblem from the state flag.

The first state to feature a slogan on their license plates was Idaho in 1928; this was the precursor to their current "Famous Potatoes" slogan. Other license plate slogans have also been made famous by their longevity. The oldest continually used slogan is Maine's "Vacationland", which has been featured on the state's license plates since 1936. Arizona has used the slogan "Grand Canyon State" since 1940, the same year Wisconsin started using the slogan "America's Dairyland". Illinois has used the slogan "Land of Lincoln" since 1954. North Carolina's "First in Flight" license plates have been on the road since 1982, as a nod to the Wright Flyer. Meanwhile, Ohio uses the slogan "Birthplace of Aviation", as the Wright brothers were native Ohioans themselves.

Other states use a more simple design for their license plates, often with little decoration other than a slogan. Vermont license plates have frequently featured a green and white color scheme, while Alaska has preferred yellow and blue. New Jersey uses a yellow gradient background on its license plates, while Connecticut uses a similar navy blue background. The license plates of California, Maryland, Massachusetts, Michigan, Texas, and Virginia feature a plain white background, though Virginia notably uses a serif font for its serial dies. Delaware's license plates feature gold text on a black background, a design that has been unchanged since the 1960s.

Florida, Indiana, Maryland, Michigan, Minnesota, Nebraska, Oklahoma, Pennsylvania, South Carolina, Tennessee and Virginia have placed the address of the state's official or tourism web site on their general issue plates. Most plates in the District of Columbia contain the phrase "Taxation without representation" to highlight the District's lack of a voting representative in Congress.

As of 2025, the five oldest plate designs in use – each with slight to moderate cosmetic changes since inception – are that of Delaware (in production since 1959), Colorado (since 1960, continuously since 1978), the District of Columbia (since 1975), Minnesota (since 1978), and North Carolina (since 1982).

=== Printing of registration number ===
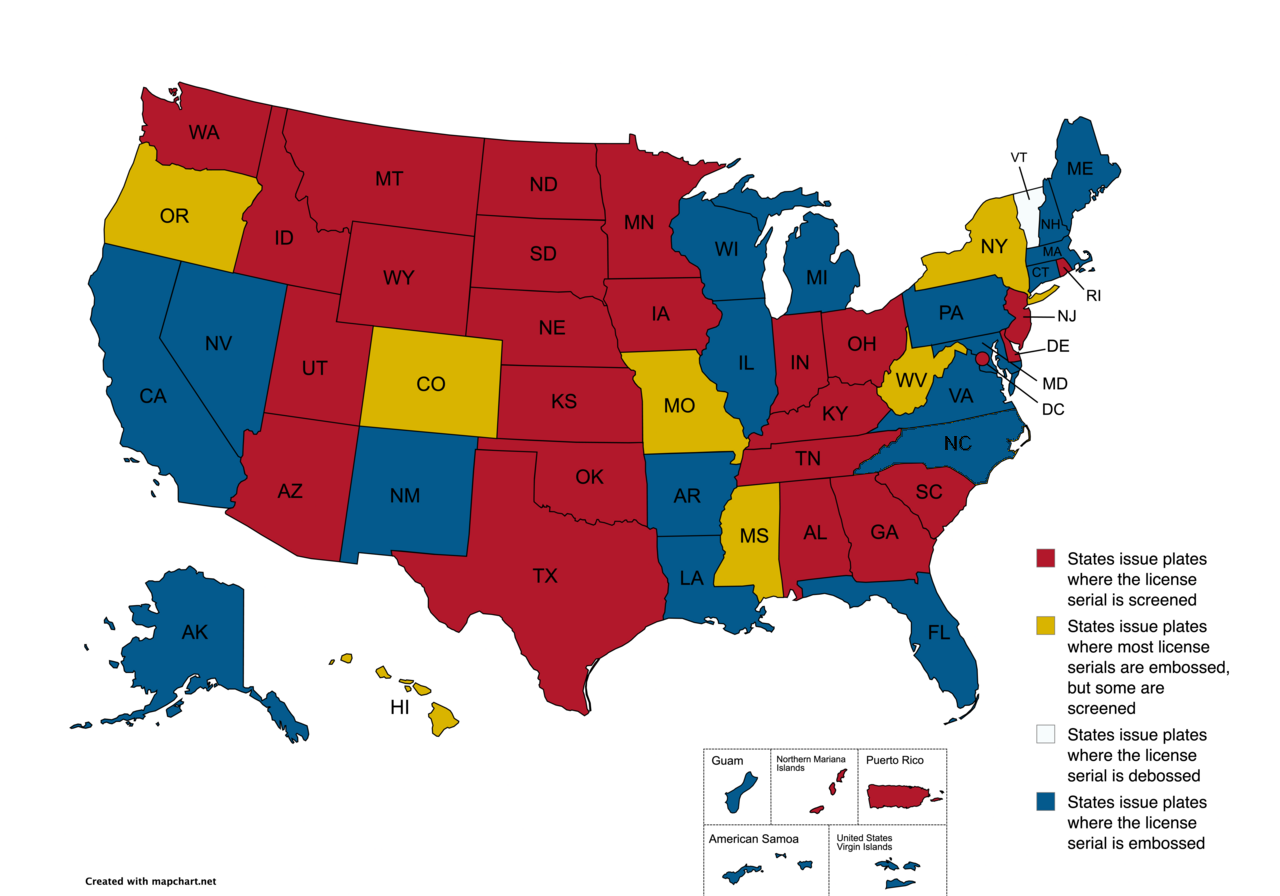
Serial Printing Formats as of June 2025: States issue plates where the license serial is screened States issue plates where most license serials are embossed, but some are screened States issue plates where the license serial is debossed States issue plates where the license serial is embossed

Typically, the registration number is embossed – or, more rarely, impressed – onto the license plate. Other identifying information, such as the name of the issuing jurisdiction and the vehicle class, can be either surface-printed or embossed; Virginia, for example, does the former for passenger cars and the latter for most non-passenger vehicles. However, it is increasingly common in the U.S. for the registration number to be surface-printed using digital printing technology. Colorado, Hawaii, Mississippi, Missouri, New York, Oregon and West Virginia do so only for certain types of license plates, such as vanity plates and special issues; Alabama, Arizona, Georgia, Idaho, Indiana, Iowa, Kansas, Kentucky, Minnesota, Montana, Nebraska, New Jersey, North Dakota, Ohio, Rhode Island, South Carolina, South Dakota, Tennessee, Texas, Utah, Washington, Wyoming, and the District of Columbia have switched to the so-called flat-plate technology for all their license plates with Utah being the latest, changing in January 2025. Nevada formerly issued flat plates but has returned to making embossed plates. Delaware license plates have not been embossed for several decades. Texas & Wyoming normally issue flat plates but also issue embossed license plates for an extra fee. North Carolina issued flat specialty plates from 2008 to 2009 but didn't find any cost savings so switched back to full embossed plates. They also issued flat plates when they mandated that the license plates be replaced every 7 years, but that program was canceled after 4 months. In 2018, California started a pilot program in which the city of Sacramento issued license plates on battery-powered digital displays, for an extra fee. The registration number is displayed on an electronic paper screen that can theoretically update itself to display different messages. The license plate itself is also equipped with a beacon that can be tracked in case the car associated with the plate is stolen.

Vermont is the only state with a registration number debossed into the license plate.

License plates originally were not embossed, but were merely flat plates in various forms, typically rectangular. In the 1930s, states found that the plates could be easily forged, and subsequently began embossing plates to thwart counterfeiting.

=== Plate sizes ===
In 1956, U.S. states and Canadian provinces came to an agreement with the Automobile Manufacturers Association that fixed the size of all passenger vehicle plates at 6 by 12 inches (150 by 300 mm), with mounting holes spaced 7 inches (180 mm), although the dimensions may vary slightly by jurisdiction. In North America, only Greenland (a Danish autonomous territory) and Saint Pierre and Miquelon (a French overseas territory) have not adopted these standards, as they use European standards instead (although the Northwest Territories has a plate shaped like a polar bear that is cut out of a standard rectangular plate). Smaller-sized plates are used for motorcycles and, in some jurisdictions, mopeds and certain types of trailers and construction equipment. Motorcycle plates are not standardized but have mostly come to be 4 by 7 inches (100 by 180 mm) in nearly every state by the 1980s, with the exception of Minnesota, which still uses 4 3/16 by 7 3/16 inches (106 by 183 mm), with the most recent state to change being Maryland in 2008, which was previously 4 1/2 by 7 inches (110 by 180 mm). Furthermore, the U.S. territory of Puerto Rico issues European sized plates for an extra fee.

== Showing current registration on plates ==
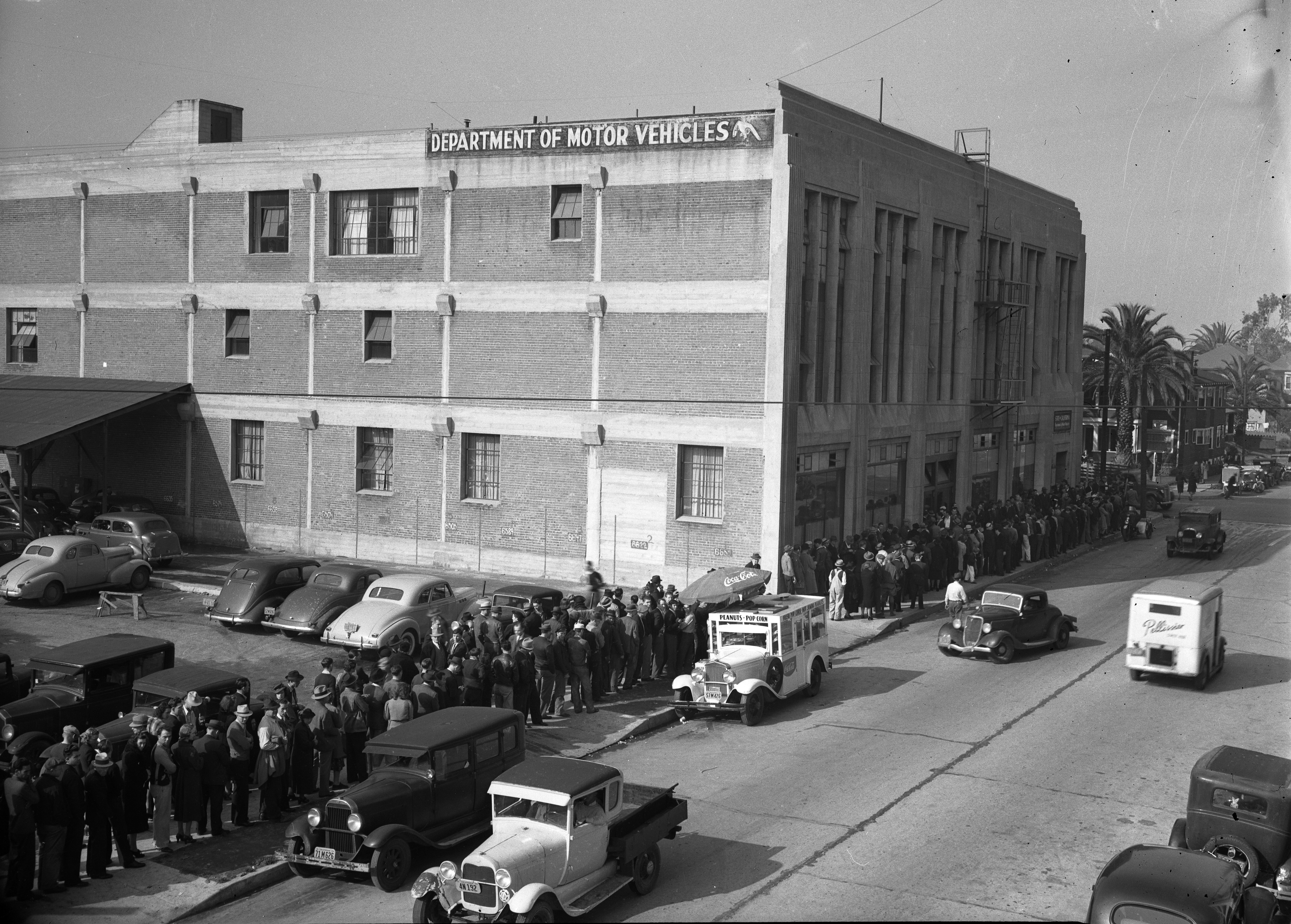
Line for automobile license plates, Los Angeles California Department of Motor Vehicles, 1940

Historically, license plates were replaced every year. Today, the most common practice is to issue new validation stickers every year or two, to indicate that the vehicle registration is still valid.

Expired vehicle registrations may attract the attention of law enforcement, because indicators of an expired plate, such as an old or invalid sticker, give officers probable cause to lawfully initiate a traffic stop. A delinquent registration tag is often an indicator that the vehicle's owner has failed to comply with the applicable law regarding emission inspection or insurance or that the vehicle's owner has unpaid traffic or parking tickets. Most states historically required all license plates to be replaced every few years; that practice is being abandoned by many states because of the expense of continually producing large numbers of plates. Washington stopped the practice of mandatory replacement in 2015. Maryland previously mandated that all license plates be replaced every five years (except for apportioned trailers, which were registered on an eight-year schedule), but has not done so since 1986.

In jurisdictions that use validation stickers on the plate, the month and year of expiration may be separated into two decals, or issued in a single sticker. For example, North Carolina previously issued separate month and year decals, but recently switched to a single sticker. In others, such as Texas, the plate's validation is a decal displayed from the inside of the windshield. The colors of plate stickers and windshield decals often change annually, to support enforcement of registration laws.

Most validation stickers are either serialized (with the serial number recorded on the registration), or are printed by a special printer at the time of registration or renewal with the vehicle's license plate number on them to discourage fraudulent sticker use, as the sticker will be valid only for the plate for which it was intended. In the District of Columbia, the license plate is validated with a windshield sticker that indicates the expiration date in MM/DD/YY format, the license plate number, the year and make of vehicle, and part of the vehicle identification number, allowing easier fraud detection, in addition to serving as a parking permit for neighborhood residents.

New York, Texas, and the District of Columbia use windshield stickers exclusively, rather than plate stickers, for most vehicle classes. Their registration stickers include the month and year of expiration (and, in the District of Columbia, the day) in large type, so that an expired registration windshield sticker is obvious. In 2015, Texas eliminated the requirement to display a windshield vehicle inspection decal with the registration. Connecticut switched to windshield stickers in September 2006, and in August 2010, eliminated registration stickers completely, primarily to reduce costs. New Jersey required the use of plate decals for a few years, beginning with November 2000 expiration dates, but has not required them on passenger cars since October 1, 2004. New Jersey passenger vehicles do not display any registration information other than the license plate itself.

Pennsylvania issued validation stickers for Philadelphia residents that were displayed in the lower left corner of cars' rear windows for a few years to thwart sticker theft from plates; the practice ended in late 2003 with the last issued stickers bearing January 2005 expirations. As of January 2017, Pennsylvania no longer issues any registration stickers.

In Hawaii, counties compete over the cost of vehicle registration dues. Vehicles are purchased at a discount on Oʻahu compared to the neighboring islands where there is usually only one dealer per vehicle make. Because the outlying counties issue plates starting with M (Maui County), K (Kauaʻi), or H (Big Island of Hawaiʻi), the source of the vehicle can be identified.

In Michigan, Minnesota, and Washington state, license plate registration stickers are often called "tabs."

== Life cycle ==
Under state laws, when a person moves to a new state with the intent to remain indefinitely, they are required to register personal vehicles in the new state. The new state will then issue a plate or plates that must be attached to the vehicle. One significant exception is active duty military service members; under federal law, they do not change their legal residence (domicile) upon moving to a new posting and are not obliged to obtain new vehicle registrations. Undergraduate students attending college or university in a state outside their state of legal residence are also typically exempted from transferring their registration, while graduate students are typically not exempt. Louisiana does not extend this privilege to leased vehicles used by students, and requires local registration. A few other states, such as New York, allow, although do not require, out-of-state students to register their vehicles in state.

When a vehicle is sold, the disposition of the license plates depends on state law and varies by state. In some states, license plates are transferred with the vehicle to its new owner. In other states, the license plates remain with the seller, who may, for a fee, transfer the license plates and any unused portion of the current registration to a new vehicle. Some states issue a new plate whenever the car is sold.

There are different schemes for reissuing license plates, a process known as "replating". In some jurisdictions, plates are issued on a permanent basis and are not replaced unless the owner requests a new plate or a remake of the current plate if the jurisdiction offers remakes. Other jurisdictions re-plate on a rolling basis, replacing a particular motorist's plate when it reaches a certain age. Still other jurisdictions may recall a particular series of plates for reissuance at regular or irregular intervals. This is particularly common in jurisdictions in which only one license plate series or design is valid at any given time. Optional-issue plates may or may not follow the same rules for replacement as standard-issue plates, depending on the jurisdiction. New plates may also be required when the existing plates are so physically degraded as to be illegible. Some states with county coding such as Nebraska or Mississippi may use replating to reset a format to prevent it from being exhausted.

In North Carolina in 2006, the legislature voted to require over 500,000 older plates to be recalled and replaced when a new design was introduced in 2007.

== Mounting ==
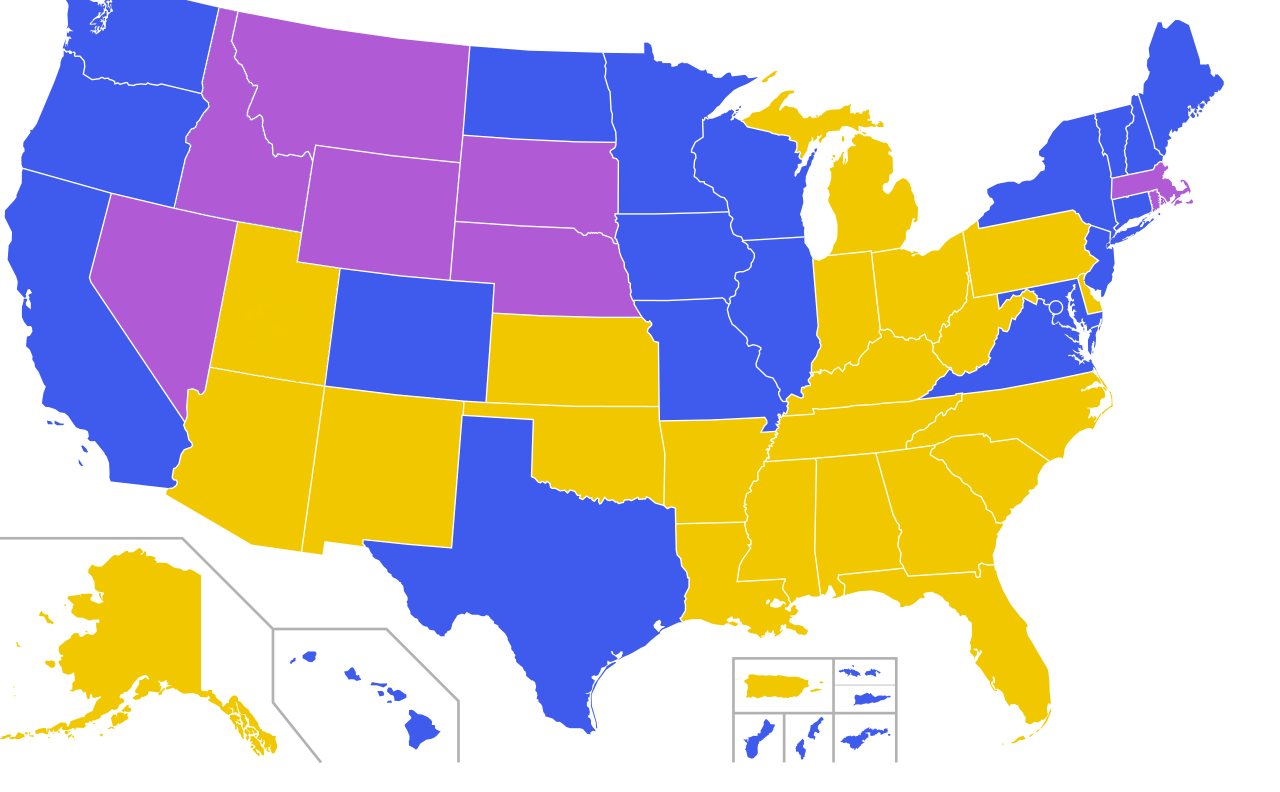
Current license plate mounting requirements in the United States as of June 2026: Only rear plates required Front and rear plates required Front and rear plates generally required, with exceptions

For passenger vehicle registrations, U.S. states require vehicles to display either one or two license plates (i.e., at the rear of the vehicle only or on the front and rear). (Note: For example, "California Vehicle Code section 5200". Archived from the original on April 29, 2007. requires that when two license plates are issued, one shall be displayed on the front of the vehicle and the other on the rear. "Section 11713.17". Archived from the original on April 30, 2007. makes it illegal to sell a new car without a front license plate mounting bracket (unless the buyer is expressly warned about the legal requirement and acknowledges the warning in writing).) In states that require two plates, limited exceptions may exist that allow for only a single plate to be displayed, such as for registration of commercial vehicles, government owned vehicles, diplomatic owned vehicles, dealer owned vehicles, or historic vehicles. In states like Missouri and California, two-plate jurisdictions, certain truck registrations actually require a single plate to be displayed, on the front of the vehicle only, leaving the rear with no license plate, while in California vehicles with occupational plates (dealers, dismantlers, etc.) only require one plate on the rear of a vehicle that would otherwise require two plates.

Mounting scheme	States and territories
Front and rear plates	American Samoa, California, Colorado, Connecticut, District of Columbia, Guam, Hawaii, Illinois, Iowa, Maine, Maryland, Minnesota, New Hampshire, New Jersey, New York, North Dakota, Northern Mariana Islands, Oregon, Texas, Vermont, Virgin Islands, Virginia, Washington, Wisconsin
Rear plates only	Alabama, Alaska, Arizona, Arkansas, Delaware, Florida, Georgia, Indiana, Kansas, Kentucky, Louisiana, Michigan, Mississippi, New Mexico, North Carolina, Ohio, Oklahoma, Pennsylvania, Puerto Rico, South Carolina, Tennessee, Utah, West Virginia
Front and rear plates for most vehicles	Idaho, Massachusetts, Missouri, Montana, Nebraska, Nevada, Rhode Island, South Dakota, Wyoming

Some common exceptions include trailers, which are issued only one plate, even in states that otherwise issue two plates to all passenger vehicles, while certain other non-passenger types, such as apportioned, may be issued in pairs even in states that otherwise issue only rear plates to passenger vehicles. Pennsylvania, for example, requires a front plate for semi-trailer trucks. Some vanity and specialty plates in Arizona and Kansas are issued in pairs, but only the rear plate is required on the vehicle; the front plate is free and fully optional.

In January 2012, the Texas legislature inadvertently removed the penalty for driving without a front license plate. As a result, the law required front and rear license plates on passenger vehicles, but stated no penalty for non compliance. Realizing the mistake, the legislature eventually reinstated the $200 fine in September 2013.

Massachusetts is a unique case for license plate mounting as, under state law, motorists with Massachusetts registrations must display all plates issued to them. Before the introduction of the current "Spirit of America" base starting in 1986 for commercial vehicles, as well as vanity plates in 1988 for all other vehicles, the state issued only a single green-on-white plate to be mounted on the rear bumper. With the current-issue base, two plates are issued and are to be mounted on both the front and rear bumpers. In 2017, an estimated 900,000 drivers had plates on the green-on-white base.

In Nevada, all motor vehicles, with the exception of motorcycles and trailers, are issued two license plates. According to state law, most standard passenger vehicles issued two plates are required to display them on both the front and rear bumpers of the vehicle. Display of the front license plate, however, is optional for vehicles that either were not designed to have a front plate, or the manufacturer did not provide a plate bracket or other means for front display of a license plate. As a result, the law to display both the front and rear plates is rarely enforced, and it is not uncommon for owners of vehicles with Nevada license plates to remove the manufacturer-supplied front license plate brackets from their vehicles and display only the rear plate. In 2015, the Wyoming State Legislature amended state law, similar to Nevada, to remove the requirement that a front license plate be displayed on vehicles that either are not specifically designed to have a front plate, or the manufacturer did not provide a plate bracket or other means for front display of a license plate. The Nebraska Legislature amended state law in a similar manner in 2016. In 2017, the Montana State Legislature also amended state law in a similar manner, exempting such passenger vehicles from displaying a front plate but requiring motorists to first obtain approval from the Montana Highway Patrol.

South Dakota will issue passenger vehicles a single rear plate for a $25 fee, but only if the vehicle will be driven less than 7,500 miles (12,100 km) every year.

In 2016, the Iowa General Assembly attempted to pass a law that exempts "vintage" vehicles and two-seat, low-profile sports cars, like Corvettes, from the front license plate requirement. Originally, the bill was meant to repeal the front license plate requirement for all vehicles, but was amended as a compromise. The bill was later withdrawn.

In April 2019, the Ohio General Assembly amended state law to require the display of only a rear license plate starting in July 2020, marking the first time since World War II that Ohio has not had front plates.

In 2022, the Alaska State Legislature passed a law stating only one license plate would be issued per vehicle.

As of January 1, 2025, Utah no longer requires or issues front license plates.

On April 4, 2025, the governor of Idaho signed a bill stating that front license plates are only required "if the vehicle is equipped with a front license plate mounting bracket." This law went into effect on July 1, 2025.

Nebraska passed a law on April 10, 2025, removing the requirement for front license plates starting on January 1, 2029. This is when the new plate cycle starts as Nebraska issues plates every 5 years.

Rhode Island passed a law that went into effect on June 24, 2026 that allows for the use of a single rear plate on vehicles without a manufacturer equipped front license plate bracket. Vehicles equipped with such a bracket must still use both a front and rear license plate. Vehicles displaying a single rear plate must maintain the second plate within the vehicle to be presented to law enforcement if requested.

== Temporary and transit registrations ==
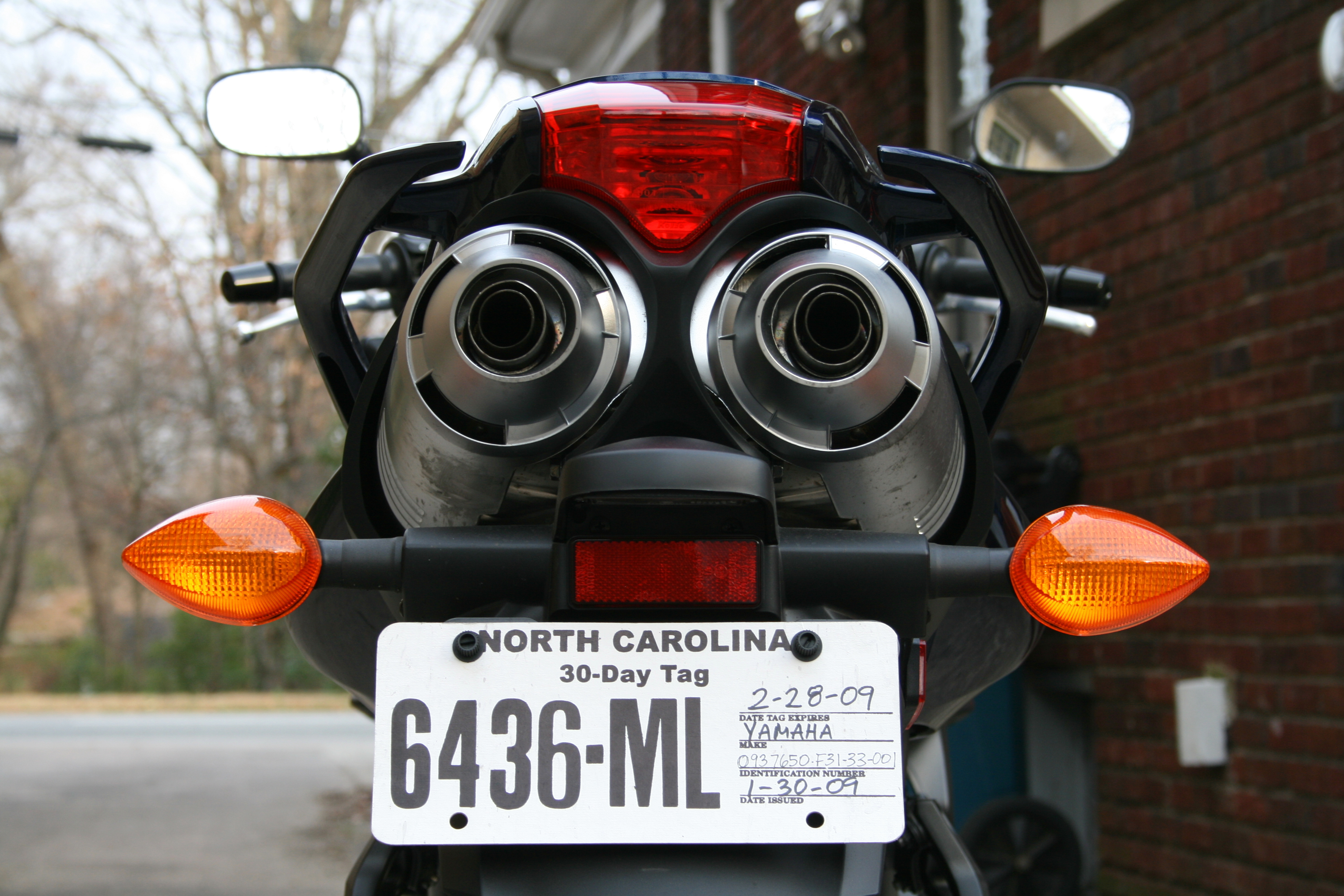
A temporary 30-day license plate on a motorcycle in North Carolina

When a person buys a vehicle from a dealer, the dealer is typically authorized to issue a temporary registration to allow the buyer to drive the vehicle until the government agency in charge of vehicle registration processes the registration forms.

Similarly, when a person buys a vehicle outside their state or province of residence, they can usually obtain a "transit registration" from the authorities of the state or province where the purchase took place. This transit registration will allow the new owner to drive the vehicle and to properly register and obtain license plates for the vehicle from their state or province of residence.

The physical indicia of such temporary or transit registrations can take a variety of forms, such as:

- a paper, cardboard, or lightweight plastic license plate, to be removed at the end of the temporary registration period (typically a set number of days, e.g., 15, 30, or 45 days);
- a standard metal license plate with temporary validation, in which case the government agency needs to issue only a validation sticker rather than a license plate; or
- a form or decal to be applied to a window of the vehicle.

While paper is still commonly used for temporary plates, Texas switched to metal plates in 2025, allowing dealerships to keep a supply of the new plates on-site. Cited benefits of this move include reduced fraud and easier verification of registrations for law enforcement.

== Vanity and specialty plates ==
=== Vanity plates ===
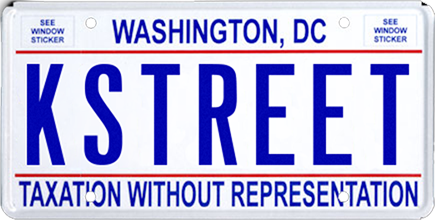
A KSTREET license plate from Washington, D.C.

In each of the 50 U.S. states and the District of Columbia, motorists are given the option of extra-cost vanity plates (also known as personalized or prestige plates), which are license plates with a custom serial (sequence of letters or numbers). Generally, vanity plates may not contain profane or obscene messages, although standards as to what constitutes an unacceptable message vary widely among issuing jurisdictions. Rhode Island has not issued any new vanity license plates since 2021 following a court ruling regarding enforcement of profanity rules. In California, motorists may order symbols – a heart, hand, plus sign, or star – on one type of specialty plate. Other states, such as New Hampshire and North Carolina, also permit the use of certain punctuation symbols. The state of Virginia offers more than 200 unique designs for license plates. A tenth of all U.S. vanity plates are in Virginia (which has 1.6 million vanity plate registrations), giving it the highest concentration of vanity plates issued by a state.

Certain classes of vanity plates may require proof of authorization, such as a person obtaining an amateur radio plate with their call sign must show their amateur radio license. Persons obtaining disabled veteran or Medal of Honor or Purple Heart medal recipients must show proof of their disability and military service or their award of the specific medal, respectively.

Vanity plates sometimes cause unexpected difficulties for their owners when they contain messages that are otherwise default filler text in state and federal computer systems. In 1979, a Los Angeles resident received 2,500 parking citations from throughout the state because the DMV's computers matched his plate, “NULL", with citations for cars without license plates. In 2026, a New York City woman who had registered "BLANK" (her maiden name) updated her car's registration to an address on Manhattan's Upper East Side, and soon received more than 400 citations totaling over $40,000 from throughout the city for the same reason. She eventually changed to a different plate, and New York state placed "BLANK" on its vanity plate blacklist in response to her case. Other such cases have been reported for plates that say "MISSING", "NOTAG", "VOID", "NONE" and "XXXXXXX".

==== Vanity plate lawsuits ====
Restrictions in the messages allowed on vanity plates have led to some major court cases. In 2001, Paula Perry, a state administrator, sued the Vermont DMV when her plate, SHTHPNS, was recalled. In another case from New Hampshire, the state attempted to recall the plate "PB4WEGO", but the owner of the plates successfully appealed.

==== Low-digit plates ====
Delaware's three-digit plates can bring $50,000 and two-digit plates can bring upwards of $400,000. These estimates have sometimes been exceeded: in 2008, plate number 6 brought $675,000 at auction, and in 2018, plate number 20 fetched $410,000 at auction. Bids have come from around the world, even though only drivers with Delaware licenses and residency can legally own the plates.

In Rhode Island, license plates with low serial numbers have been distributed by politicians and have become known as status symbols. The Rhode Island Governor's office instituted an official lottery for so-called "preferred plates" in 1995.

Low-digit, all-numeric plates are also available in Massachusetts, Illinois, and Washington, D.C. In these places, low-digit plates are seen as status symbols. In Illinois, as in Rhode Island, low-digit plates can also be distributed by politicians.

=== Specialty plates ===
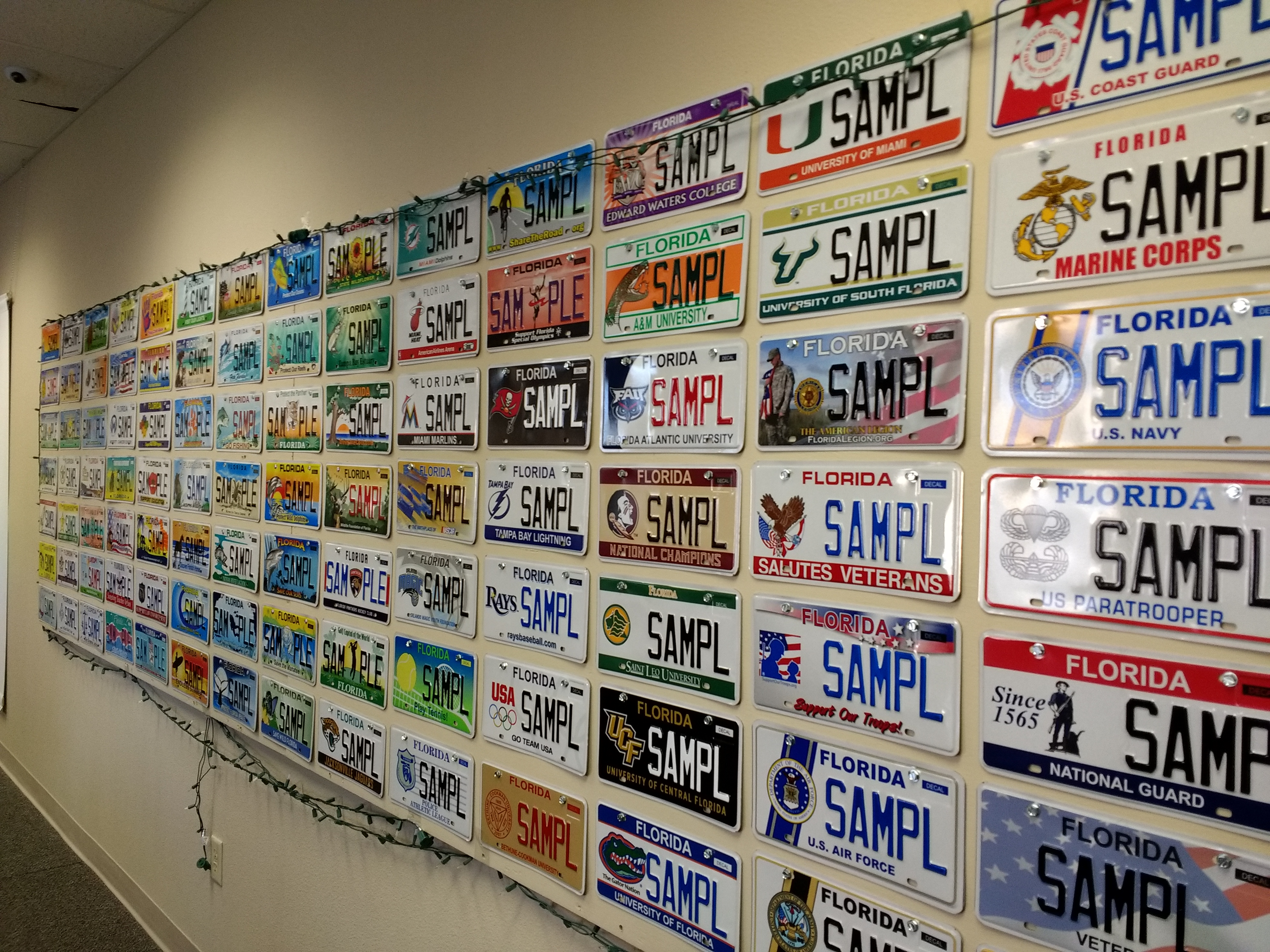
A collection of specialty license plates in Florida

In some jurisdictions, vehicle owners may also pay extra for specialty plates. With these, the plate serial is chosen by the licensing agency – as with regular plates – but the owners select a plate design that is different from the normal license plate. For example, an alumnus or student of a university or college might purchase a plate with the school's logo, or an outdoorsman might decide to pay extra for a plate depicting a nature scene. A portion of the extra cost of these license plates often ends up as a donation for a related school or non-profit organization.

Some jurisdictions allow for some or all of their specialty plates to also be vanity plates, usually for an additional fee on top of the cost of the plate.

States may also provide commemorative plates as a standard issue, for example for a state's 100th or 125th anniversary.

==== Types ====
Normally such specialty plates can be purchased without proof of any particular status or affiliation, exceptions being plates which indicate membership or abilities of use in an emergency (e.g., firefighter, police, EMT, amateur radio operator). Also, some states require that university or college plates be ordered through alumni associations. Other specialty plates include those for motorists with specific accomplishments or backgrounds; for example, a veteran who was a prisoner of war or a Purple Heart recipient may obtain a POW or Purple Heart specialty plate, respectively, after presenting documentation of his or her status to the registrar. In many jurisdictions, there is no charge (or at least no extra charge) for such a plate, in recognition of the veteran's service.

Because specialty plates are government issued, they are required under First Amendment issues to be issued as a type to any group or organization that qualifies under the same terms as any other group to be issued a type of plate. The State of Maryland was going to revoke permission for use of the Confederate flag from a certain plate by the Sons of Confederate Veterans, but a court ruled that the only way the state could do that was to revoke permission on all specialty plates. All U.S. states offer specialized license plates for licensed amateur radio operators, in many cases at no extra charge or at a discount compared to standard vanity plates. In some states statutes regarding amateur radio plates were enacted decades prior to vanity plate programs. Among the stated reasons in various state statutes for providing special amateur radio plates are to recognize amateur radio operators for their service, and to enhance visibility of amateur radio operators in an emergency. The owner's radio call sign is used instead of a standard-issue serial. Texas allows radio amateurs to have their call sign on the license plates of multiple vehicles that they own, in effect allowing more than one vehicle to share the same license plate number. As Amateur Radio call signs are standardized under the FCC and internationally under the ITU, it is highly plausible such registrations would not just be unique in the issuing state, but rather the entire country and internationally (a possible example of a de facto national license plate).

==== Examples ====
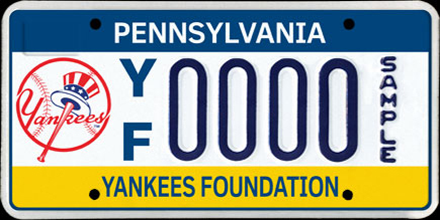
New York Yankees specialty plate issued by Pennsylvania

One example of a specialty license plate was a plate issued in 1987 by the state of Florida to commemorate the Space Shuttle Challenger disaster. Proceeds benefit the Astronauts Memorial Foundation, and funded the construction and maintenance of the Space Mirror Memorial at the Kennedy Space Center Visitor Complex in Merritt Island, Florida. The current version of the plate, and the second revision since its inception, introduced in 2004, commemorates both Challenger and Columbia. It remained the most popular of all of Florida's specialty plates until it was overtaken by a plate to support the critically endangered Florida panther. In 2006, it was outsold by a plate for the University of Florida. Florida currently offers 122 specialty plates, but Texas leads the nation in specialty plates with 360 designs followed by Virginia with 340.

There also exist standard-issue specialty plates. For instance, a number of states issued plates recognizing the U.S. Bicentennial in 1976. Several states have also issued plates commemorating milestones in their own state, such as when, in 1998, Alaska celebrated the Centennial of the Klondike Gold Rush with new license plates showing prospectors on the trail to the Yukon. Tennessee commemorated its 1996 bicentennial celebration by issuing standard plates labelled "BicenTENNial" in the place of the state's name; these plates remained standard issue until 2001, five years after the celebration had ended. States often issue plates with their motto or slogan, such as North Carolina's "First in Flight" and Ohio's "Birthplace of Aviation". These are arguably also general commemorative items. By law, all plates issued in Alabama must contain the words "Heart of Dixie" inside a small heart symbol. Over the years, due to sensitivities over the word "Dixie", the symbol (which currently resides in white letters inside a red heart) has been shrunken to the minimum size. In protest, proponents of the "Heart of Dixie" slogan often buy third-party decals with the slogan in much larger text, placing them over the current "Stars Fell On" slogan at the top of the plates.

New Jersey offers an optional "animal friendly" license plate. The second generation of this plate was first issued in 2001 and features characters from the comic strip Mutts by Patrick McDonnell. A portion of the revenue from the plates goes to the New Jersey State Department of Health's Animal Population Control Program. Some states where stock car racing is popular issue special NASCAR-themed plates; a NASCAR fan can purchase a plate with the name and car number of his or her favorite driver, along with the state-issued alphanumeric sequence. Here, a portion of the extra cost goes to NASCAR as compensation for licensing its trademarks. States offering NASCAR plates featuring designs for different drivers are Alabama, Georgia, Mississippi, New York, North Carolina, Oklahoma, Pennsylvania, South Carolina, and West Virginia; Florida issues one NASCAR-themed plate.

In Indiana, a pilot program allows large fleet vehicle operators to customize an Indiana license plate specific to their organization. The United Parcel Service is the first such fleet operator to take advantage of this offering. This kind of specialty plate can only be purchased by the owner of the fleet and is not considered a general issue plate.

Because of the ubiquity of license plates, special plates – or even regular ones – can raise controversy. The state of Colorado, in recognition of the Columbine High School massacre, released a license plate with the picture of the eponymous state flower, the Columbine, with the words "Respect Life." Some people complained that they felt the "Respect Life" saying was intended to be an anti-abortion message. Sometimes even ordinary plates can spark controversy. For instance, George Maynard did not like the state motto on his New Hampshire license plate, "Live Free or Die", because he and his wife felt it repugnant to their beliefs as Jehovah's Witnesses and chose to cover it with tape. He was prosecuted and convicted for defacing a license plate. The United States Supreme Court ruled in Wooley v. Maynard, 430 U.S. 705 (1977), that since one is compelled to have a license plate on one's vehicle, they are permitted not to have to show a message from the state to which they have a moral objection, and overturned his conviction.

=== Restrictions ===
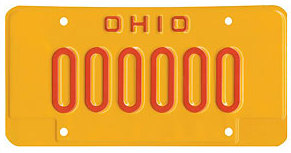
Sample version of Ohio's DUI plate mandated on DUI offenders with limited driving rights

In New Jersey, people convicted of drunk driving can be banned from using vanity plates. In Ohio, convicted drunk drivers are mandated to drive with “Party Plates”, special red-on-yellow license plates in exchange for limited driving privileges such as work. In Georgia and Minnesota, drunk drivers may be ordered to display a plate with a special numbering system indicating restricted driving privileges. These are referred to as "Whiskey Plates" in Minnesota.

=== Confederate States–affinity plates ===
Nine U.S. states have issued commemorative or affinity license plates for the Sons of Confederate Veterans (SCV) as a result of a national campaign for approval of plates commemorating the Confederate States. Starting in the late 1990s, the SCV took various states to court and each time won the right to issue plates and include their Confederate Battle Flag–based logo on the basis it was a free speech issue. However, the 2015 Supreme Court decision Walker v. Texas Division, Sons of Confederate Veterans allowed states to remove the Confederate flag from plates finding that the plates were speech by the state. The use of the Confederate Battle Flag and other Confederate symbols on the plates has stirred controversy, but Jay Barringer, commander of the Maryland Division of Sons of Confederate Veterans, has said "We're trying to divest ourselves of the negative associations" with the Confederate flag. In some states, revenues are shared with the SCV organization.

- Alabama: Sons of Confederate Veterans Commemorative License Plate (2013–current)
- Georgia: Sons of Confederate Veterans Commemorative License Plate (2014–current) The plate was condemned as racist by critics. In 2015 the state suspended sales after the South Carolina church shooting but resumed sales after a redesign removed a Confederate Battle Flag from across the background, but left the small flag in the SCV logo.
- Louisiana: Sons of Confederate Veterans Commemorative License Plate. (1999–current) Prior to 2016 between zero and 14 plates were issued each year. In fiscal 2016, 61 plates were issued after it became an election issue.
- Maryland: Sons of Confederate Veterans Commemorative License Plate (????–current) 18 years after a court decision finding the plates were protected as free speech, in November 2015 Maryland recalled the plates with the Confederate Battle flag and replaced them with a version without the offending flag, following the US Supreme Court ruling in Walker v. Texas Division, Sons of Confederate Veterans There were 178 plates in 2015.
- Mississippi: Sons of Confederate Veterans Commemorative License Plate (2003–current) featuring the Confederate Battle Flag in the organization logo Revised in 2011 for the 150th anniversary of the Civil War. A proposal to put General Forrest on the plates created controversy.
- North Carolina: Sons of Confederate Veterans Commemorative License Plate (1998–2021)
- South Carolina: Sons of Confederate Veterans Commemorative License Plate (????–current) a 2015 report found that 1,020 plates generated about $20,000 every two years for SCV under a revenue sharing deal with the state.
- Tennessee:
  - Sons of Confederate Veterans Commemorative License Plate (1999–current) In 2015 a little over 3,000 plates showed the SCV logo.
- Virginia:
  - Robert E. Lee Commemorative License Plate (????–current) which gives his birth and death dates and the words "Southern Gentleman"
  - Sons of Confederate Veterans Commemorative License Plate (????–current). In 2015 the state banned plates with the Confederate Battle Flag, following a federal court ruling. There were 1,677 SCV plates in 2015 and no revenue sharing arrangement with the SCV.
- Texas: refused to issue SCV plates in 2011, which the SCV took to the US Supreme Court, and lost in June 2015. Texas then banned plates with the Confederate Battle Flag. The organization vowed to continue fighting for the issuance of plates by submitting alternative designs.

== Professional and governmental plates ==
=== Department-specific examples ===
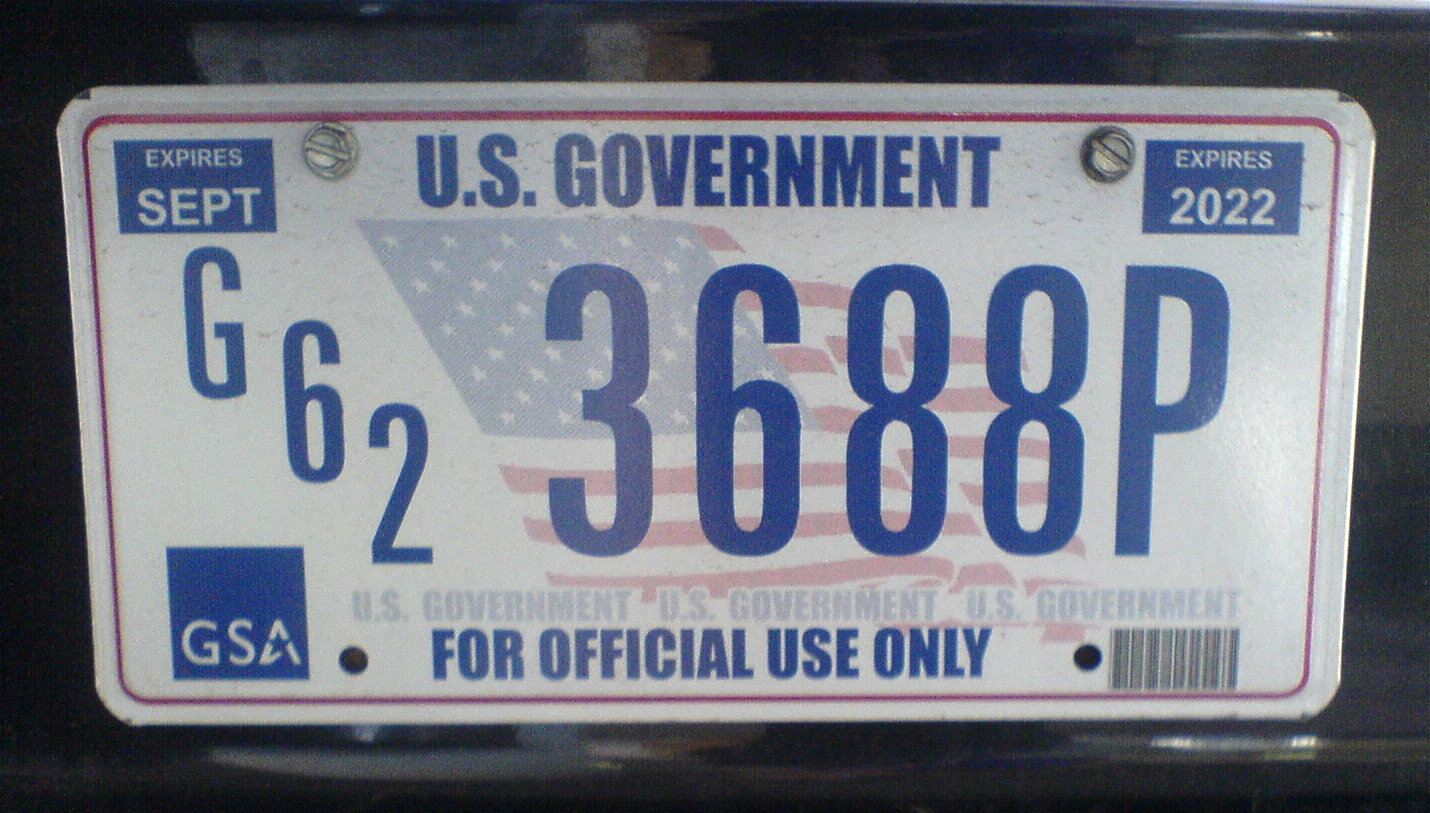
2010-Present style US Government license plate

In the United States, most states issue some special sort of license plate for vehicles which are owned by state and local governments. For the most part, the plates are similar to the regular passenger plates, except with a separate numbering sequence or with a message such as "government", "official", "state owned", "municipal", or "exempt" (from registration fees) replacing the slogan.

The federal government issues plates for vehicles it owns, with a few exceptions. Vehicles owned by a branch of the U.S. military may have a license plate issued by that branch of the military, although combat vehicles will have no license plate at all, only an identification number applied directly to the body. The United States Postal Service adopts the same practice, especially for its delivery trucks.

The general format of US government plates is a letter prefix followed by 4 to 6 numbers and a letter, with plates ending with T always being trailer plates, and plates ending in M being motorcycle plates, a majority of US Government vehicles using U.S. General Services Administration (GSA) plates, which begin with the letter G, followed by a two letter vehicle class code then a four-digit sequential number and a letter either before or after the sequential number, however certain departments and agencies set their own unique numbering system.

For example, the United States Air Force plates begin with AF, two numbers representing the two-digit year the vehicle was put into service, a letter representing the vehicle class, and a five-digit serial number

Federal Bureau of Prisons plates start with J (for Department of Justice) followed by 3 numbers, and a 3 letter code indicating which federal prison the vehicle is attached to except for inmate transfer buses which are assigned the code BUS.

All US government plates have a fixed expiration of 8 years, 6 months after issuance.

Starting in 2015 with 2023 expiring plates, US Government plates now have a small letter A or B in the bottom left corner of the plate allowing for the inventorying of both front and rear plates.

Federal license plate codes are prefixed based on the relevant government entity:

Federal entity	License plate code
Department of Agriculture	A
Department of the Air Force	AF
Armed Forces Italy	AFI
American Forces Information Service	AFIS
Armed Forces Retirement Home	AFRH
Architect of the Capitol	AOC
Appalachian Regional Commission	ARC
U.S. Agency for Global Media	BBG
Department of Commerce	C
Corps of Engineers, Civil Works	CE
U.S. Commodity Futures Trading Commission	CF
U.S. Capitol Police	CP
Consumer Product Safety Commission	CPSC
Court Services & Offender Supervision Agency for the District of Columbia	CS
U.S. District Court	CT
Department of Defense	D
Defense Contract Audit Agency	DA
Defense Commissary Agency	DECA
U.S. International Development Finance Corporation	DFC
Defense Health Agency	DHA
Department of Homeland Security	DHS
Defense Intelligence Agency	DIA
Defense Information Systems Agency	DISA
Defense Logistics Agency	DLA
Delta Regional Authority	DRA
Department of Transportation	DOT
Department of Energy	E
U.S. Enrichment Corporation	EC
Department of Education	ED
U.S. Equal Employment Opportunity Commission	EEOC
Export-Import Bank	EIB
Executive Office of the President	EO
Environmental Protection Agency	EPA
Emergency Response & Continuity (House of Representatives)	ERC
Federal Communications Commission	FC
Farm Credit Administration	FCA
Federal Deposit Insurance Corporation	FD
Federal Housing Finance Agency	FHFA
Federal Mediation & Conciliation Service	FM
Federal Reserve Board	FRB
Federal Trade Commission	FTC
GSA Fleet	G
Government Accountability Office	GAO
Government Printing Office	GGP
General Services Administration	GS
Department of Health and Human Services	HHS
Department of Housing and Urban Development	HUD
Department of the Interior	I
U.S. Information Agency	IA
International Trade Commission	ITC
Department of Justice	J
Judicial Branch Government Accountability Office	JB
John F. Kennedy Center for the Performing Arts	JFKC
Department of Labor	L
District of Columbia Redevelopment Land Agency	LA
Legislative Branch	LB
Library of Congress	LC
U.S. Marine Corps	MC
Millennium Challenge Corporation	MCC
U.S. Merit Systems Protection Board	MSPB
Department of the Navy	N
National Aeronautics and Space Administration	NA
National Endowment for the Arts	NEA
National Guard Bureau	NG
National Gallery of Art	NGA
National Labor Relations Board	NL
National Capital Planning Commission	NP
Nuclear Regulatory Commission	NRC
National Science Foundation	NS
Overseas Private Investment Corporation	OPIC
Office of Personnel Management	OPM
United States Postal Service	P
Pension Benefit Guaranty Corporation	PBG
Pretrial Services Agency	PSA
Presidio Trust	PT
Railroad Retirement Board	RR
Department of State	S
United States Senate Sergeant at Arms	SAA
Small Business Administration	SB
Defense Security and Exchange Commission	SC
U.S. Securities and Exchange Commission	SE
U.S. Soldiers' and Airmen's Home	SH
Smithsonian Institution	SI
International Broadcasting Bureau	S-IBC
Selective Service System	SS
Department of the Treasury	T
Tennessee Valley Authority	TV
U.S. Agency for International Development	U
Peace Corps	UPC
Department of Veterans Affairs	VA
Army	W
Army & Air Force Exchange Service	X

=== State-specific examples ===
Many states issue license plates to members of certain professions who require some sort of special privileges, such as parking or going behind police lines. Examples include plates for members of the press, doctors, nurses, EMTs, paramedics, volunteer firefighters, judges, medical examiners, and elected officials.

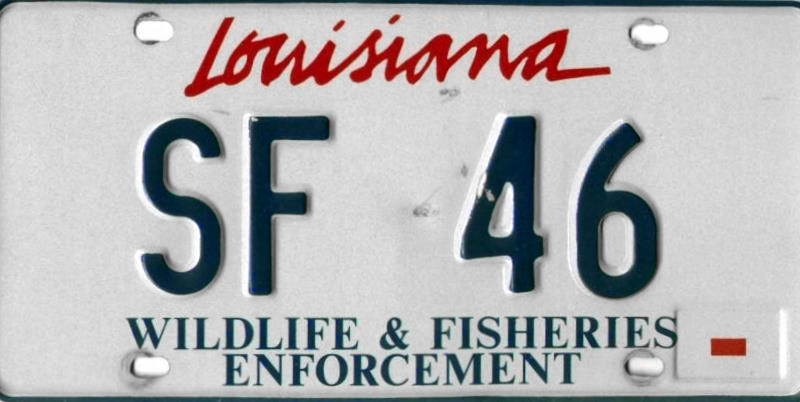
License plate of the Louisiana Department of Wildlife & Fisheries - Enforcement Division

Some states use a distinctive color scheme to differentiate the plates from the regular issue. For example, in Virginia, state government license plates use the format "12-345S" and have a light blue background, while local government license plates use the format "123-456L" and have a tan background. The standard issue has a white background and a different numbering scheme. In Vermont, municipal government plates have a red background instead of the usual green background with the letters "MUN" stacked to the right of the serial; State Police plates are green with yellow lettering instead of white, matching the color scheme of VSP patrol vehicles. Other state owned vehicles use the standard green background, with the word "STATE" diagonally appearing before the serial.

In Florida, government vehicles have a black-on-yellow scheme.

California Exempt plate

California diamond Exempt plate

California octagon Exempt plate

Old California government plates have the letter "E" inside either an octagon or a diamond, which are no longer issued, but still valid. Old government vehicles will either have a diamond or octagon before 6 random digits while newer government vehicles say ¨CA EXEMPT" at the top of the license plate in red instead of the regular ¨California¨ in red cursive and will have seven random digits, beginning with the number "1".

In Colorado, government vehicles affix a "GVT" code vertically before the plate number.

Governmental vehicles in North Carolina are issued permanent black-on-yellow (state-owned) or black-on-orange/aluminum (all other governmental) license plates, however vehicles belonging to the State Highway Patrol are sometimes registered with normal passenger car plates or with special vanity plates (with stamped years instead of stickers) similar to normal plates, with the prefix SHP before a unique number (i.e. SHP1234). Government vehicles with black-on-orange/aluminum are the police (including sheriff and undercover police vehicles), school buses, public transportation buses, postal services, and county vehicles.

In North Dakota, government vehicles have the standard background and affix the code "OFCL" vertically before the plate number. The plate number begins with SF for which stands for State Fleet (example: SF1234).

Government vehicles in South Carolina are issued a permanent white plate with black text, or formerly a permanent off-white plate containing the state seal inside the state outline with blue text. They are prefixed or sometimes suffixed by SG, RG, CG or MG for state-government, regional level government, county government, or municipal government respectively by a series of numbers. Examples include SG12345, 56789SG, or recently SG1234A. Vehicles belonging to the South Carolina Highway Patrol have plates that contain the logo of the highway patrol and prefix HP. For example HP1234 A similar format is also given to plates on South Carolina State Transport Police Division vehicles. For example STP1234

Pennsylvania issues a white on blue (blue on white on earlier plates, some still in use) plate for state-owned vehicles (PA prefix/suffix which carry the OFFICIAL USE legend), municipal (MG prefix or suffix) and vehicles that are owned by Penn State, which carry the STATE UNIVERSITY legend. State-owned and Penn State-owned vehicles are also issued front plates, as are press photographers, however, the press photographer plates are issued on the standard base and carry a PP prefix inside a large keystone.

Government vehicles in Georgia are issued a plate in the standard design but a numbering series prefixed by "GV" and a decal on the left side of the plate indicating what type of government the plate is issued to (authority, (school) board, city, county, or state), before that, vehicles were issued just numbers with the type of service the vehicle was used for and GOVT running horizontal beside the number and shown at right for reference. For example, plates can be formatted as GV12345, GV1234A, or formerly GOVT/12345 and GOVT/123456. Also, Georgia State Patrol vehicles have special-issue plates they are required to display on both the front and rear of the vehicle – most other vehicles in Georgia only have rear plates – that have an image of the GSP's patch and the trooper's badge number.

Most Washington State Patrol vehicles use the same format as passenger cars, with the exception that the letters are all "WSP". For example: 123 WSP. The format "1234 SP" may also be seen on WSP vehicles but not as common. In this format only the numbers change, with the SP (State Patrol) designation remaining constant.

The District of Columbia issues special license plates to vehicles owned by the DC government and the District of Columbia Water and Sewer Authority. While ambulances and other support vehicles of the District of Columbia Fire Department have special red and white plates, fire engines are not issued license plates. Vehicles belonging to the Washington Metropolitan Area Transit Authority display standard DC license plates appropriate to the class of vehicle, with special validation stickers. The transit authority police cars are issued ordinary District of Columbia passenger license plates, but the authority replaces them with self-issued number plates indicating the vehicle is with the transit police.

In Honolulu, Hawaii, the license plates on TheBus matches the fleet number of the bus they are assigned to, using a BUS-123 format. Similarly, the Massachusetts Bay Transportation Authority in Boston, Massachusetts, places license plates on their buses featuring the agency's logo (a "T" inside a circle) followed by the bus number.

In Hawaii, state owned government vehicles use license plates that begin with State then letter and number, EX: State A175, however older state owned vehicles use just numbers, EX: State 8743.

Government vehicle

State vehicle

Ohio's government-owned vehicles use red on white plates with the legend "City", "County", and "Government" with a special format of ABC123, and they use the legend "State Vehicle" with the format 12 3456. Just like in New York, Police vehicles are not issued license plates.

Michigan uses a unique "123X456" format for municipal vehicles (including municipal transit buses, public school buses owned and operated by the school district, and police vehicles), "123G456" for "in-transit repair" vehicles, "12D345" for dealer vehicles, "123M456" for vehicles owned by manufacturers of cars, "123T456" for transporter vehicles and "123Y456" for vehicles owned by non-profit agencies, such as church buses, buses of private schools, and chapters of the American Red Cross. Michigan State Police plates have the State Police shield on the left side, followed by a four-digit fleet number. The first two digits of this fleet number indicate the State Police post number where the vehicle is assigned. County sheriff plates follow the 12*345 format (the asterisk representing a six-pointed star), but feature a black background and white letters; the left two digits represent the number of the county in alphabetical order. Vehicles owned by the State of Michigan can also have a plate using the format of "MSG 1234" (where MSG stands for Michigan State Government) or a plate with the format of "X12345" with the caption "STATE GOVT" under.

In New York State, Minnesota, and Ohio, local police vehicles are not issued license plates, though New York State requires the vehicles to have roof mounted emergency lights. In some cases, such as New York City, the fleet number of the vehicle is put on a flat license plate using heat transferred letters. In Yonkers, there is a special plate that appears similar to the specialized optional plates with the Yonkers Police logo and the fleet number. Other communities in the state have a license plate that looks like the regular issue vanity plate, but with the word "POLICE" on it. New York formerly indicated rental cars with the sequence beginning with "Z", but that apparently encouraged targeting by car thieves.

In Missouri, state owned vehicles are issued "Official Vehicle" plates, but otherwise all vehicles owned by local governments entities in Missouri are not issued license plates by the state and instead each government entity is responsible for furnishing their vehicles with their own license plates, with most entities electing to purchase plates from the State Prison system which only produces local government plates in a single style.

In Tennessee, state owned vehicles are given a green plate with white lettering in the S0A000 format with Gov't Service on the bottom of the plate and locally owned vehicles are given a white plate with black lettering with Gov't Service on the bottom in the 0000-AA format. Tennessee Highway Patrol cars are issued a green plate (usually placed in the trunk) and have displayed a gold plate with the officer's district number assigned to it

Alabama issues plates with either 00000 CO (county) CM 000 (county motorcycle), 0000 PUD (public utility) MM 000 (municipal motorcycle) or 00000 MU (municipal) plates on a blue background with black lettering and state owned vehicles get a white plate with black lettering and the S0000A format, SM00 (state motorcycle) or SMP 000 (state pool)

Delaware uses plates that start with S for state owned vehicles and CY for county owned vehicles. Older versions spelled out State Owned or County Owned but have largely disappeared from use. Fire trucks get a white plate with red numbers starting with EV. Police cars get standard number plates however the registration sticker is slightly different (in the days of color coded stickers, the color patterns were inverted for police cars). Both regular and police vehicles owned by the Delaware River and Bay Authority (a joint agency with New Jersey) use standard Delaware license plates for most vehicles in both states.

In Indiana. Police vehicles will have a white license plate with a badge to the left with “POLICE” written at the bottom. Municipality owned vehicles will have a blue plate with “MUNICIPAL” written at the bottom. These plates along with some trailers do not expire. In some examples, Government owned or police civilian cars will have a standard passenger plate but will not have an expiration date or sticker in the top corners. Tractor-Trailers can order a company specific license plate with the company's name at the bottom or a logo on the left hand side.

== General registration license plates ==
Many states issue special plates to automobile dealers, auto repair shops, farms, and construction contractors, which are not tied to any particular vehicle. These users typically have many more vehicles on the premises than on the public streets, and it would not be practical to register and insure each individual vehicle. As a result, they hold a number of "floating" registrations that enable them to legally drive multiple vehicles on the public streets. States typically have rules about who is eligible and how the plates may be used, and may impose record keeping and audit requirements.

In every state, auto dealers are allowed to place a special dealer registration plate on a vehicle that the dealer is holding for sale or resale. Most states do not allow the use of dealer plates on vehicles that have already been sold. Most states allow dealer plates to be used only by a dealership owner, officer, or employee, or by a customer who is test driving an automobile. Most states do not allow dealer plates to be used by anyone who is not affiliated with the dealership. In addition, dealer plates are not allowed to be used as a way to avoid payment of sales tax on the purchase of a vehicle.

== Diplomatic license plates ==
Diplomatic license plates are issued by the United States Department of State to accredited diplomats. This is an exception to the general rule in the U.S. that license plates are issued by states, and not the federal government. However, prior to the 1980s, diplomatic plates were issued by states, with New York issuing the most, followed by the District of Columbia.

Until 2007, plates issued to cars based in the District of Columbia followed the pattern of a letter identifying the status of the owner, followed by the two-letter country code, followed by a four-digit number (S LL NNNN). For member countries of the Organization of American States (OAS), a subset of that numbering pattern is allotted to vehicles based at those countries' missions to the OAS. Plates issued to cars based at the United Nations in New York City are reversed, with the four-digit number first, followed by the two-letter country code, followed by the status code (NNNN LL S). This is because representatives of certain countries are limited to travel to certain radii from their base, and the system allows the city of assignment to be identified easily.

The status codes used until 2007 were "C" for foreign consul; "D" for diplomat; "S" for non-diplomatic staff; and "A" for a UN employee. The status code indicates the type of diplomatic, consular, or other immunity enjoyed by the vehicle's registrant. The country codes are unique to each particular country, but do not correlate to ISO Country Codes or other standards format. For example, in the old system used until 2007, France is "DJ" not "F" and Australia is "XZ" not "AUS". This is to prevent the general public from targeting diplomats from particular countries. Diplomatic license plates are made in Virginia, so they use similar dies to those on that state's license plates.

Certain U.S. states issue honorary consul plates to U.S. citizens who have been appointed to that office and perform consular functions on a part-time basis.

For a list of serial formats of diplomatic plates, see the article about United States license plate designs and serial formats.

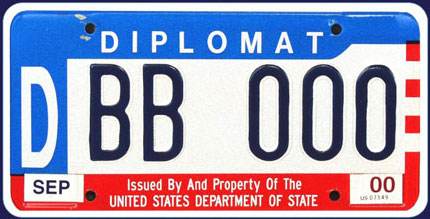
Old U.S. diplomatic license plate of the style issued until 2007

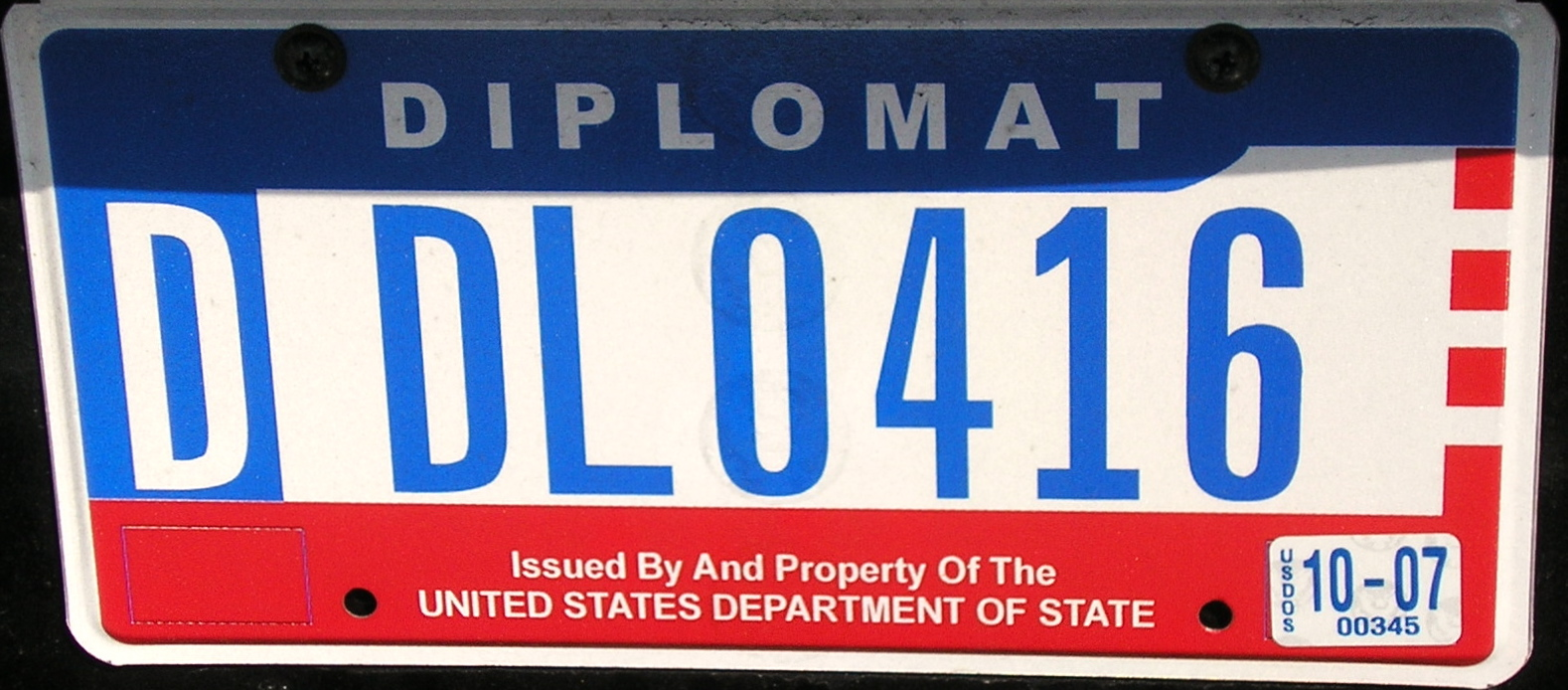
Old U.S. diplomatic license plate with surface-printed serial

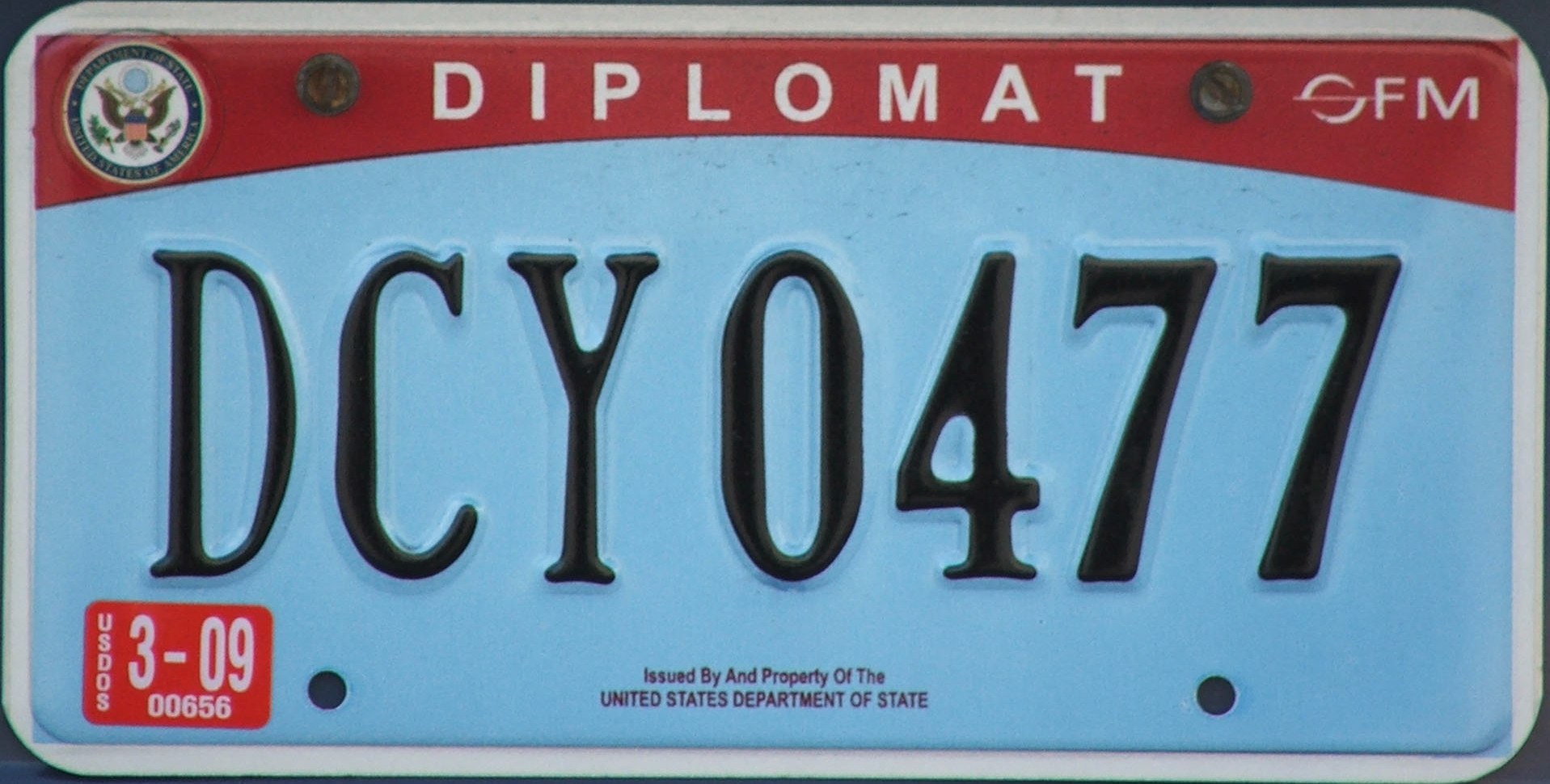
U.S. diplomatic license plate of the style issued since 2007, using same die set used on Virginian license plates

U.S. Consul License Plate
