= Vehicle registration plates of Idaho =

Idaho vehicle license plates

Idaho

Current series
- Slogan: Famous Potatoes
- Size: 12 in × 6 in 30 cm × 15 cm
- Material: Aluminum
- Introduced: September 1991; screened serials used from April 2008 onward

Availability
- Issued by: Idaho Transportation Department, Division of Motor Vehicles

History
- First issued: May 7, 1913

The U.S. state of Idaho first required its residents to register their motor vehicles and display license plates in 1913. As of 2026, plates are issued by the Idaho Transportation Department through its Division of Motor Vehicles. Front and rear plates are required for most classes of vehicles, while only rear plates are required for motorcycles and trailers.

== Passenger baseplates ==
=== 1913 to 1967 ===
In 1956, the United States, Canada, and Mexico came to an agreement with the American Association of Motor Vehicle Administrators, the Automobile Manufacturers Association and the National Safety Council that standardized the size for license plates for vehicles (except those for motorcycles) at 6 inches (15 cm) in height by 12 inches (30 cm) in width, with standardized mounting holes. The 1956 (dated 1957) issue was the first Idaho license plate that fully complied with these standards: the issues from 1952 through 1955 (dated 1953 through 1956) were all 6 inches in height by 12 inches in width, but had non-standard mounting holes.

Image	Dates issued	Design	Slogan	Serial format	Serials issued	Notes
	1913	Embossed white serial on blue plate; "IDAHO 1913" at right	none	1234	1 to approximately 2500	
	1914	Embossed white serial on red plate; "IDAHO 1914" at right	none	1234	1 to approximately 3500	
	1915	Embossed red serial on white plate; "IDAHO 1915" at right	none	1234	1 to approximately 8000	
	1916	Embossed black serial on yellow plate; "IDAHO 1916" at right	none	12345	1 to approximately 13000	
	1917	Embossed yellow serial on black plate; "IDAHO 1917" at right	none	12345	1 to approximately 25000	
	1918	Embossed white serial on brown plate; "IDAHO 1918" at right	none	12345	1 to approximately 35000	
	1919	Embossed yellow serial on dark green plate; "IDAHO 1919" at right	none	12345	1 to approximately 40000	
	1919	As above, but with "IDA 1919" at right	none	12345	40001 to approximately 43000	
	1920	Embossed white serial on dark blue plate with border line; "IDA 1920" at right	none	12345	1 to approximately 55000	
	1921	Embossed black serial on orange plate; black lines at top and bottom borders; "IDAHO 1921" at right	none	12345	1 to approximately 65000	
	1922	Embossed orange serial on black plate; orange lines at top and bottom borders; "IDA 1922" at right	none	12-345	1 to approximately 60-000	
	1923	Embossed orange serial on silver plate with border line; "IDA 1923" at right	none	12-345	1 to approximately 62-000	
	1924	Embossed black serial on yellow plate; "IDA X-24" at right	none	12-345	1 to 60-000; 70-001 to approximately 72-000	Serials 60-001 through 70-000 reserved for trucks.
	1925	Embossed black serial on white plate with border line; "IDAHO X-25" at bottom	none	12-345	1 to approximately 74-000	
	1926	Embossed black serial on orange plate with border line; "IDAHO X-26" at bottom	none	12-345	1 to approximately 87-000	
	1927	Embossed orange serial on dark blue plate, "IDAHO–27" at bottom	none	12-345	1 to approximately 95-000	
	1928	Debossed green serial within embossed tan potato graphic on green plate with border line; "1928" at bottom right	"IDAHO POTATOES" at bottom, offset to left	12-345	1 to approximately 99-999	
	1929	Embossed golden yellow serial on black plate with border line; "IDAHO - 1929" at bottom	none	123-456	1 to approximately 120–000	
	1930	Embossed black serial on golden yellow plate with border line; "1930 - IDAHO" at bottom	none	123-456	1 to approximately 112–000	
	1931	Embossed white serial on black plate with border line; "IDAHO – 1931" at top	none	123-456	1 to approximately 115–000	
	1932	Embossed black serial on orange plate with border line; vertical "IDA" at right and "1932" centered at top	none	A/1 1–234	Coded by county of issuance (A/1)	
	1933	Embossed orange serial on black plate; "19 - IDAHO - 33" at bottom	none	1A-12-34	Coded by county of issuance (1A)	
	1934	Embossed black serial on golden yellow plate; "19 - IDAHO - 34" at bottom	none	1A-12-345	Coded by county of issuance (1A)	
	1935	Embossed golden yellow serial on black plate; "19 - IDAHO - 35" at top	none	1A-12-345	Coded by county of issuance (1A)	
	1936	Embossed black serial on golden yellow plate; "19 - IDAHO - 36" at bottom	none	1A-12-345	Coded by county of issuance (1A)	
	1937	Embossed black serial on silver plate with border line; "IDAHO - 1937" at bottom	none	1A-12-345	Coded by county of issuance (1A)	
	1938	Embossed white serial on maroon plate with border line; "IDAHO - 1938" at bottom	none	1A-12-345	Coded by county of issuance (1A)	
	1939	Embossed yellow serial on blue plate; "IDAHO - 1939" at bottom	none	1A-12-345	Coded by county of issuance (1A)	
	1940	Embossed green serial on gold plate; "1890 IDAHO 1940" centered at bottom	"50 YEARS STATEHOOD" centered at top	1A-12-345	Coded by county of issuance (1A)	
	1941	Embossed black serial on yellow plate; "1941" at bottom right	"SCENIC IDAHO" at bottom, offset to left	1A-12-345	Coded by county of issuance (1A)	
	1942–44	Embossed dark blue serial on white plate; "42" at bottom right	"SCENIC IDAHO" at bottom, offset to left	1A-12-345	Coded by county of issuance (1A)	Revalidated for 1943 and 1944 with windshield stickers, due to metal conservation for World War II.
	1945	Embossed black serial on golden yellow plate with border line; "45" at bottom right	"SCENIC IDAHO" at bottom, offset to left	A-12-34; 0A-12-345	Coded by county of issuance (A or 0A)	Current county-coding system introduced.
	1946	Embossed white serial on black plate with border line; "46" at bottom right	"SCENIC IDAHO" at bottom, offset to left	A-12-34; 0A-12-345	Coded by county of issuance (A or 0A)	
	1947	Embossed white serial on dark blue plate with border line; embossed graphic in the center featuring a skier and mountains; "19 IDAHO 47" centered at top	"Vacation Wonderland" centered at bottom	A 1234; 0/A 12345	Coded by county of issuance (A or 0/A)	
	1948–49	Embossed black serial on silver plate; baked potato sticker in the center; "IDAHO 48" centered at top	"World Famous POTATOES" centered at bottom	A 1234; 0/A 12345	Coded by county of issuance (A or 0/A)	Revalidated for 1949 with silver tabs.
	1950	Embossed white serial on black plate with border line; "IDAHO 50" centered at top	none	A 1234; 0/A 12345	Coded by county of issuance (A or 0/A)	
	1951–52	Embossed white serial on maroon plate with border line; "IDAHO 51" centered at top	none	A 12345; 0/A 12345	Coded by county of issuance (A or 0/A)	Revalidated for 1952 with silver tabs.
	1953	Embossed white serial on black plate with border line; "IDAHO 53" centered at top	"WORLD FAMOUS POTATO" at bottom	A 12345; 0/A 12345	Coded by county of issuance (A or 0/A)	
	1954	Embossed black serial on white plate with border line; "IDAHO 54" centered at bottom	none	A 12345; 0/A 12345	Coded by county of issuance (A or 0/A)	
	1955	Embossed white serial on black plate with border line; "IDAHO 55" centered at bottom	none	A 12345; 0/A 12345	Coded by county of issuance (A or 0/A)	
	1956	Embossed black serial on white plate with border line; "IDAHO 56" centered at top	"WORLD FAMOUS POTATO" at bottom	A 12345; 0/A 12345	Coded by county of issuance (A or 0/A)	
	1957	Embossed white serial on light green plate with border line; "IDAHO 57" centered at top	"FAMOUS POTATOES" centered at bottom	A 12345; 0/A 12345	Coded by county of issuance (A or 0/A)	
	1958	Embossed dark green serial on white plate with border line; "IDAHO 58" centered at top	"FAMOUS POTATOES" centered at bottom	A 12345; 0/A 12345	Coded by county of issuance (A or 0/A)	
	1959	Embossed white serial on dark green plate with border line; "IDAHO 59" centered at top	"FAMOUS POTATOES" centered at bottom	A 12345; 0/A 12345	Coded by county of issuance (A or 0/A)	
	1960	As 1958 base, but with "IDAHO 60" at top	"FAMOUS POTATOES" as on 1958 base	A 12345; 0/A 12345	Coded by county of issuance (A or 0/A)	
	1961	As 1959 base, but with "IDAHO 61" at top	"FAMOUS POTATOES" as on 1959 base	A 12345; 0/A 12345	Coded by county of issuance (A or 0/A)	
	1962	As 1958 base, but with "IDAHO 62" at top	"FAMOUS POTATOES" as on 1958 base	A 12345; 0/A 12345	Coded by county of issuance (A or 0/A)	
	1963	As 1959 base, but with "IDAHO 63" at top	"FAMOUS POTATOES" as on 1959 base	A 12345; 0/A 12345	Coded by county of issuance (A or 0/A)	
	1964	As 1958 base, but with "IDAHO 64" at top	"FAMOUS POTATOES" as on 1958 base	A 12345; 0/A 12345	Coded by county of issuance (A or 0/A)	
	1965	As 1959 base, but with "IDAHO 65" at top	"FAMOUS POTATOES" as on 1959 base	A 12345; 0/A 12345	Coded by county of issuance (A or 0/A)	
	1966	As 1958 base, but with "IDAHO 66" at top	"FAMOUS POTATOES" as on 1958 base	A 12345; 0/A 12345	Coded by county of issuance (A or 0/A)	
	1967	As 1959 base, but with "IDAHO 67" at top	"FAMOUS POTATOES" as on 1959 base	A 12345; 0/A 12345	Coded by county of issuance (A or 0/A)	

=== 1968 to present ===
Image	Dates issued	Design	Slogan	Serial format	Serials issued	Notes
	1968–70	Embossed green serial on white plate with border line; "IDAHO 68" centered at top	"FAMOUS POTATOES" centered at bottom	A 12345; 0/A 12345; 1/A A1234	Coded by county of issuance (A or 0/A)	
	1971–73	As above, but with simply "IDAHO" centered at top	"FAMOUS POTATOES" centered at bottom	A 12345; 0/A 12345; 1/A A1234	Coded by county of issuance (A or 0/A)	
	1974	Embossed green serial on white plate with border line; "IDAHO 74" centered at top	"FAMOUS POTATOES" centered at bottom	A 12345; K A1234; 0/A 12345; 0/A A1234; 1/A AB123	Coded by county of issuance (A or 0/A)	
	1975–82	As above, but with simply "IDAHO" centered at top	"FAMOUS POTATOES" centered at bottom	A 12345; K A1234; 0/A 12345; 0/A A1234; 1/A AB123	Coded by county of issuance (A or 0/A)	
	1982–85	Embossed green serial on white plate; "IDAHO" screened in green centered at top, with the 'A' resembling a mountain peak	"Famous Potatoes" screened in green centered at bottom	A 12345; K A1234; 0/A 12345; 0/A A1234; 1/A AB123	Coded by county of issuance (A or 0/A)	Serials in each county continued from where the 1974–82 plates left off.
	1985–87	Embossed green serial on white plate; screened green lines above and below serial; screened green Sawtooth Mountains graphic on top line at the right; "IDAHO" screened in green to left of graphic, with the 'A' resembling a mountain peak	"Famous Potatoes" screened in green centered below serial, just above bottom line	A 12345; K A1234; 0/A 12345; 0/A A1234; 1/A AB123	Coded by county of issuance (A or 0/A)	Serials in each county continued from where the 1982–85 plates left off.
	1987–89	Embossed green serial on white plate; screened green lines above and below serial; screened green Sawtooth Mountains graphic on top line at the right; "IDAHO" screened in green to left of graphic, with the 'A' resembling a mountain peak	"Famous Potatoes" screened in green centered below serial, just above bottom line	A 12345; 0/A 12345; 1/A A1234; 2/C 123456	Coded by county of issuance (A or 0/A)	Top line cut off at the left, allowing for taller county-code characters. This plate replaced all 1974–87 plates; serials in each county thus restarted from 1.
	1989 – September 1991	Embossed green serial on white plate; screened green lines above and below serial; screened green Sawtooth Mountains graphic on top line at the right; "IDAHO" screened in green to left of graphic, with the 'A' resembling a mountain peak	"Famous Potatoes" screened in green centered below serial, just above bottom line	A 12345; 0/A 12345; 1/A A1234; 2/C 123456	Coded by county of issuance (A or 0/A)	Narrow serial dies introduced, allowing for six-digit serials in Canyon County. (Ada County had already gone over to one-letter, four-digit serials after reaching 99999.)
	September 1991 – June; 1997	Embossed dark blue serial on mountain scene with red and white gradient sky, pale blue mountains and dark blue forest; tall dark blue tree screened at far right; "IDAHO" screened in white centered at top	"Scenic" screened in white to left of state name, giving "Scenic Idaho"; "FAMOUS POTATOES" screened in white centered at bottom	A 123456; 0/A 123456	Coded by county of issuance (A or 0/A)	Modification of the optional Centennial base introduced in 1987 (see Optional plates below). Awarded "Plate of the Year" for best new license plate of 1991 by the Automobile License Plate Collectors Association, the second time Idaho was so honored.
	June 1997 – April; 2008	As above, but with tall dark blue tree removed and red section of sky reduced in height	"Scenic" screened in white to left of state name, giving "Scenic Idaho"; "FAMOUS POTATOES" screened in white centered at bottom	A 123456; 0A 12345; 0A A1234; 0A AB123; 0A 1A234; 1A 1234A; 1A 123AB; 10B 1234; 10B A123	Coded by county of issuance (A or 0A)	Full-size county codes introduced in addition to design modifications, all for better visibility. Serials in each county continued from where the 1991–97 plates left off, but were now restricted to seven characters (including the county-code characters).
	April 2008 – December 2020	As above, but with screened black serial and full white border around plate	"Scenic" screened in white to left of state name, giving "Scenic Idaho"; "FAMOUS POTATOES" screened in white centered at bottom	A 123456; 0A 12345; 0A A1234; 0A AB123; 0A 1A234; 1A 1234A; 1A 123AB; 10B 1234; 10B A123	Coded by county of issuance (A or 0A)	Serials in each county continued from where the 1997–2008 plates left off.
	December 2020 – present	As above, but with screened black serial and full white border around plate	"Scenic" screened in white to left of state name, giving "Scenic Idaho"; "FAMOUS POTATOES" screened in white centered at bottom	A 1234U; A A123U; K AB12U; 0A 1234U; 0A A123U; 0A AB12U; 0A ABC1U; 10B 123U; 10B A12U	Coded by county of issuance (A or 0A)	New serial formats introduced in each county. Canyon County uses a P suffix instead of U as with every other county. Ada County has progressed from the U suffix to the V suffix.

== County coding ==
The current county-coding system on standard-issue Idaho license plates has been in use since 1945. The naming convention is the order of the county in an alphabetical list followed by the first letter of the county name. For example, 2T indicates the second county beginning with T in an alphabetical list, or Twin Falls County. If only one county begins with a particular letter, the letter alone serves as the county code. Specialty and vanity license plates do not use county codes; some non-passenger types are county-coded, while others are not.

County	1934–44	1945–present
Ada	1A	1A
Adams	2A	2A
Bannock	3A	1B
Bear Lake	4A	2B
Benewah	5A	3B
Bingham	6A	4B
Blaine	7A	5B
Boise	8A	6B
Bonner	9A	7B
Bonneville	1P	8B
Boundary	2P	9B
Butte	3P	10B
Camas	4P	1C
Canyon	5P	2C
Caribou	6P	3C
Cassia	7P	4C
Clark	8P	5C
Clearwater	9P	6C
Custer	1H	7C
Elmore	2H	E
Franklin	3H	1F
Fremont	4H	2F
Gem	5H	1G
Gooding	6H	2G
Idaho	7H	I
Jefferson	8H	1J
Jerome	9H	2J
Kootenai	1K	K
Latah	2K	1L
Lemhi	3K	2L
Lewis	4K	3L
Lincoln	5K	4L
Madison	6K	1M
Minidoka	7K	2M
Nez Perce	8K	N
Oneida	9K	1O
Owyhee	1R	2O
Payette	2R	1P
Power	3R	2P
Shoshone	4R	S
Teton	5R	1T
Twin Falls	6R	2T
Valley	7R	V
Washington	8R	W

== Non-passenger plates ==
Image	Type	Serial format	Serials issued	Notes
	Apportioned Tractor	P/R/P AB 1234	P/R/P AA 1 to present	
	Apportioned Trailer	P/R/P CB 1234	P/R/P CA 1 to present	
	Apportioned Truck	P/R/P BB 1234	P/R/P BA 1 to present	
	Classic	1234		Serials became screened by 9991.
	Commercial	KB 1234	KA 1 to KZ 9999	Serials became screened around KL 5000.
	Commercial	KZ 12345	KZ 10000 to approximately KZ 26000	Serials became screened around KL 5000.
	Commercial	KB C123	KA A001 to present	Serials became screened around KL 5000.
	Commercial Trailer			
	Dealer	D/L/R 1234–56		
	Disabled Person	DB 123	DA 001 to DZ 999	Serials became screened between DR 451 and DU 201. DV series reserved for Disabled Veteran plates.
	Disabled Person	DBC 12	DAA 01 to present	Serials became screened between DR 451 and DU 201. DV series reserved for Disabled Veteran plates.
	Fleet	FL12345	FL00001 to present	
	Motorcycle	MBC 123	MAA 1 to MZZ 999	Serials became screened between MPE 289 and MPH 714.
	Motorcycle	M12 345	M10 000 to present	Serials became screened between MPE 289 and MPH 714.
	Old Timer	1234		
	Street Rod	123A		
	Truck	A 12345T; A A1234T; 0A 1234T; 0A A123T	Coded by county of issuance (A or 0A)	
	Utility Trailer	123 UBC	1 UAA to 999 UZZ	Motorcycle-sized plate.
	Utility Trailer	ZBC 123	ZAA 1 to present	Motorcycle-sized plate.

== Government types ==
Image	Type	Serial format	Serials issued	Notes
	Ada County Sheriff	AC123	AC1 to present	At least some plates issued on "Celebrate Idaho Youth: America's Promise" base.
	Department of Building Safety	DBS 123	DBS 1 to present	
	Department of Labor	J 12	J 1 to present	
	Fire Department	F 1	F 1 to present	
	Gem County Sheriff	GCS 123	GCS 1 to present	
	Idaho State Police	ISP 123	ISP 1 to present	

== Optional plates ==
Image	Type	First issued	Design	Serial format	Serials issued	Notes
	Idaho Centennial	1987	Embossed dark blue serial on mountain scene with red and white gradient sky, pale blue mountains and dark blue forest; two tall dark blue trees screened at far left; "IDAHO" and "CENTENNIAL" screened in white centered at top and bottom respectively; "1890" at top left and "1990" at top right	12345C	1C to 99999C	Awarded "Plate of the Year" for best new license plate of 1987 by the Automobile License Plate Collectors Association, the first time Idaho was so honored. Adopted as standard passenger base from 1991 onwards (see above). Since the introduction of this design, the plate has been colloquially referred to by Idahoans as the "nuclear winter" plate. It remains so to this day (with the most recent 2008 design retaining the characteristic features).
	Idaho Centennial	1987	Embossed dark blue serial on mountain scene with red and white gradient sky, pale blue mountains and dark blue forest; two tall dark blue trees screened at far left; "IDAHO" and "CENTENNIAL" screened in white centered at top and bottom respectively; "1890" at top left and "1990" at top right	C12345	C1 to approximately C78000	Awarded "Plate of the Year" for best new license plate of 1987 by the Automobile License Plate Collectors Association, the first time Idaho was so honored. Adopted as standard passenger base from 1991 onwards (see above). Since the introduction of this design, the plate has been colloquially referred to by Idahoans as the "nuclear winter" plate. It remains so to this day (with the most recent 2008 design retaining the characteristic features).
	Idaho Centennial	1992	Embossed dark blue serial on mountain scene with red and white gradient sky, pale blue mountains and dark blue forest; two tall dark blue trees screened at far left; "IDAHO" and "CENTENNIAL" screened in white centered at top and bottom respectively; "1890" at top left and "1990" at top right	123 ABC	100 AAA to present	Awarded "Plate of the Year" for best new license plate of 1987 by the Automobile License Plate Collectors Association, the first time Idaho was so honored. Adopted as standard passenger base from 1991 onwards (see above). Since the introduction of this design, the plate has been colloquially referred to by Idahoans as the "nuclear winter" plate. It remains so to this day (with the most recent 2008 design retaining the characteristic features).
	Agriculture		As current passenger base, but with farm scene graphic screened at left featuring a red farmhouse, a silver silo and white clouds, and "AGRICULTURE" centered at bottom	1234A	1A to present	
	Appaloosa	2003	As current passenger base, but with Appaloosa horse graphic screened at left, "Discover Idaho Heritage" at top, and "APPALOOSA" at bottom	1234B	1B to present	
	Capitol Restoration			1234R	1R to present	
	Celebrate Idaho Youth: America's Promise			1234Y	1Y to present	
	Colleges and Universities			1234S; 12SAS; 1AB2S	1S to 9999S ? ?	Idaho State University redesigned at least by transition to surface-printed serials.
	Corvette		As current passenger base, but with Corvette logo screened at left, "Drive Idaho" at top, and "America's Sports Car" centered at bottom	1234M	1M to present	
	Elks USA	c. 2009		unknown	unknown	
	Fire Fighters		As current passenger base, but with graphic screened at left featuring two firefighters and flames, and "FIRE FIGHTERS" centered at bottom	1234X	1X to present	
	Forests Today and Tomorrow			1234F	1F to present	
	Idaho Aviation	2012	As current passenger base, but with yellow airplane graphic screened at left, "Fly Idaho" at top, and "A PILOT'S PARADISE" centered at bottom	12345I	00001I to present	
	Idaho Biking: Preserve Our Trails		As current passenger base, but with mountain biker graphic screened at left, "Biking" to right of state name, and "PRESERVE OUR TRAILS" centered at bottom	12345F	00001F to present	
	Ideas. Innovations. Idaho.		As current passenger base, but with light bulb graphic screened at left, with a yellow state shape as its filament, and "IDEAS. INNOVATIONS. IDAHO." centered at bottom	U1234	U0001 to present	
	Lewis & Clark		As current passenger base, but with graphic of a pointing Native American Indian woman screened at left, "Discover Idaho" at top, and "1803 LEWIS & CLARK 1806" centered at bottom	1234L	1L to present	
	Mining: Yesterday, Today, Tomorrow	c. 2009		12345C	00001C to present	
	National Guard			1234G	1G to present	
	On the Range	c. 2009		12345B	00001B to present	
	Peace Officer		As current passenger base, but with the logo of the Idaho Peace Officers' Memorial screened at left and "Honoring our Peace Officers" centered at bottom	1234J	1J to present	
	Pet Friendly	July 1, 2019	As current passenger base, but with dog and cat graphic screened at left and "PET FRIENDLY", with a heart on either side, centered at bottom	PF123	PF001 to present	
	Purple Heart			1234H	1H to present	
	Radio Amateur		As current passenger base, but with "RADIO AMATEUR" centered at bottom	FCC call sign	various	
	Rotary		As current passenger base, but with black Rotary logo screened at left and "Service Above Self" centered at bottom	RI123	RI001 to present	
	Sawtooth National Recreation Area		As current passenger base, but with graphic screened at left featuring a white mountain goat against a purple mountain and a white sun, and "Sawtooth National Recreation Area" centered at bottom	1234Z	1Z to present	
	Scenic Idaho: Wild Rivers			1234U	1U to present	
	Ski Idaho: Winter Wonderland		As current passenger base, but with skier graphic screened at left, "Ski" to left of state name, and "WINTER WONDERLAND" at bottom	1234K	1K to 9999K	
	Ski Idaho: Winter Wonderland		As current passenger base, but with skier graphic screened at left, "Ski" to left of state name, and "WINTER WONDERLAND" at bottom	123AK	1AK to present	
	Snowmobile: World's Best Trails			1234N	1N to present	
	Special Olympics	June 2008	As current passenger base, but with the logo of the 2009 Special Olympics World Winter Games screened at left and "SPECIAL OLYMPICS" centered at bottom	unknown	unknown	
	Support Our Troops			12345S	00001S to present	
	Supporting Rider Education		As current passenger base, but with the logo of the Idaho STAR Motorcycle Safety Program, featuring three motorcyclists, screened at left and "Supporting Rider Education" centered at bottom	1234P	1P to present	
	The Gem State		As current passenger base, but with graphic screened at left consisting of a diamond, two quartz crystals and a star garnet, and "THE GEM STATE" centered at bottom	12345E	00001E to present	
	Timeless Idaho Values: Boy Scouts			1234I	1I to present	
	Veteran			1234V	1V to present	
	Wilderness - Frank Church: River of No Return and Selway-Bitterroot					
	Wildlife – bluebird			12345	1 to present	
	Wildlife – cutthroat	2003		1234D	1D to 9999D	
	Wildlife – cutthroat	2003		123AD	1AD to present	
	Wildlife – elk	1998 redesigned c. 2008		1234E	1E to 9999E	Awarded "Plate of the Year" for best new optional license plate of 1998 by the Automobile License Plate Collectors Association, the third time Idaho was so honored. Co-recipient with Alaska.
	Wildlife – elk	1998 redesigned c. 2008		123AE	1AE to 999ZE	Awarded "Plate of the Year" for best new optional license plate of 1998 by the Automobile License Plate Collectors Association, the third time Idaho was so honored. Co-recipient with Alaska.
	Wildlife – elk	1998 redesigned c. 2008		12ABE	1AAE to 99ZZE	Awarded "Plate of the Year" for best new optional license plate of 1998 by the Automobile License Plate Collectors Association, the third time Idaho was so honored. Co-recipient with Alaska.
	Wildlife – elk	1998 redesigned c. 2008		12A3E	1A0E to present	Awarded "Plate of the Year" for best new optional license plate of 1998 by the Automobile License Plate Collectors Association, the third time Idaho was so honored. Co-recipient with Alaska.
	World Famous Potatoes		As current passenger base, but with baked potato graphic screened at left, "World" and "Famous" on either side of the state name, and "Potatoes" centered at bottom	1234T	1T to present	

=== Discontinued ===
Image	Type	Dates issued	Design	Serial format	Serials issued	Notes
	Basque	2006 – June 30, 2011	As current passenger base, but with green and white sheep wagon graphic screened at left and "BASQUE" centered at bottom	B1234	B0001 to ?	
	Breast Cancer	c. 2009–12	As current passenger base, but with pink ribbon graphic screened at left and "EARLY DETECTION SAVES LIVES" centered at bottom	unknown	unknown	
	Historic Idaho: Preserve Our Heritage	? to 2012	As current passenger base, but with graphic of a wooden house and trees screened at left, "Historic" to left of state name, and "PRESERVE OUR HERITAGE" centered at bottom	JA123		
	National Rifle Association	c. 2009–12		unknown	unknown	
