= Vehicle registration plates of Pennsylvania =

Pennsylvania vehicle license plates

Pennsylvania
Current series
- Slogan: Let Freedom Ring
- Size: 12 in × 6 in 30 cm × 15 cm
- Material: Aluminum
- Serial format: ABC1234
- Introduced: May 2025

Availability
- Issued by: Pennsylvania Department of Transportation, Driver & Vehicle Services

History
- First issued: January 1, 1906 (pre-state plates from 1903 through December 31, 1905)

The U.S. commonwealth of Pennsylvania first required its residents to register their motor vehicles in 1903. Registrants provided their own license plates for display until 1906, when the state began to issue plates.

As of 2026, plates are issued by the Pennsylvania Department of Transportation (PennDOT) through its Driver & Vehicle Services division. Only rear plates have been required on standard passenger vehicles since 1952. Most other classes of vehicle also only require rear plates, while front plates are additionally required on passenger vehicles owned by the state, and on vehicles owned by press photographers.

== Passenger baseplates ==
=== 1906 to 1958 ===
In 1956, the United States, Canada, and Mexico came to an agreement with the American Association of Motor Vehicle Administrators, the Automobile Manufacturers Association and the National Safety Council that standardized the size for license plates for vehicles (except those for motorcycles) at 6 inches (15 cm) in height by 12 inches (30 cm) in width, with standardized mounting holes. The 1955 (dated 1956) issue was the first Pennsylvania license plate that complied with these standards.

No slogans were used on passenger plates during the period covered by this subsection.

Image	Dates issued	Design	Serial format	Serials issued	Notes
	1906	White on blue porcelain; "PENNA 1906" at top or at right (see Notes)	12345	1 to approximately 14000	Plates with serials 1 through 99 had the state abbreviation and year at the right. This practice continued through 1909.
	1907	White on red porcelain; "PENNA 1907" at top or at right	12345	1 to approximately 20000	
	1908	Black on yellow porcelain; "PENNA 1908" at top or at right	12345	1 to approximately 25500	
	1909	Black on white porcelain; "PENNA 1909" at top or at right	12345	1 to approximately 34500	
	1910	White on black porcelain; "PENNA", aluminum keystone and "1910" at left	12345	1 to approximately 33500	
	1911	Black on yellow porcelain; "PENNA", aluminum keystone and "1911" at left	12345	1 to approximately 44000	
	1912	White on woodgrain-colored porcelain; "PENNA", aluminum keystone and "1912" at left	12345	1 to approximately 60000	
	1913	White on green porcelain; "PENNA", aluminum keystone and "1913" at left	12345	1 to approximately 80000	
	1914	White on black porcelain; "PENNA", aluminum keystone and "1914" at left	123456	1 to 19999; 40000 to approximately 115000	
	1915	White on medium blue porcelain; "PENNA", aluminum keystone and "1915" at left	123456	1 to 19999; 30000 to approximately 164000	
	1916	Embossed black on orange; "PENNA", keystone and "1916" at left	123456	1 to 19999; 30000 to approximately 231000	First embossed plate.
	1917	Embossed white on brown; "PENNA", keystone and "1917" at left	123456	1 to approximately 312000	
	1918	Embossed white on black; "PENNA", keystone and "1918" at left	123456	1 to approximately 368000	
	1919	Embossed red on black; "PENNA", keystone and "1919" at right	123456	1 to approximately 450000	
	1920	Embossed white on navy blue; "PENNA 1920" at bottom	123-456	1 to approximately 529-000	
	1921	Embossed black on golden yellow; "PENNA 1921" at bottom, with keystones on either side	123-456	1 to approximately 634-000	
	1922	Embossed brown on cream; "PENNA 1922" at bottom, with keystones on either side	123-456	1 to approximately 765-000	
	1923	Embossed golden yellow on navy blue; "PENNA 1923" at bottom, with keystones on either side	123-456	1 to approximately 986-000	Six-digit plates were originally 16 inches in length, but reduced to 15 inches later.
	1924	Embossed navy blue on golden yellow; "PENNA 1924" at bottom, with keystones on either side	123-456	1 to 999-999	
	1924	Embossed navy blue on golden yellow; "PENNA 1924" at bottom, with keystones on either side	A-12345	A-1 to approximately A-49000	
	1925	Embossed golden yellow on navy blue; "1925 PENNA" at bottom, with keystones on either side	123-456	1 to 999-999	
	1925	Embossed golden yellow on navy blue; "1925 PENNA" at bottom, with keystones on either side	A12-345	A-1 to approximately B58-000	
	1926	Embossed navy blue on golden yellow with border line; "1926 PENNA" at bottom, with keystones on either side	123-456	1 to 999-999	
	1926	Embossed navy blue on golden yellow with border line; "1926 PENNA" at bottom, with keystones on either side	A12-345	A-1 to approximately C59-000	
	1927	Embossed golden yellow on navy blue with border line; "1927 PENNA" at top, with keystones on either side	123-456	1 to 999-999	
	1927	Embossed golden yellow on navy blue with border line; "1927 PENNA" at top, with keystones on either side	A12-345	A-1 to approximately D63-000	
	1928	Embossed navy blue on golden yellow with border line; "PENNA 1928" at top, with keystones on either side	123-456	1 to 999-999	
	1928	Embossed navy blue on golden yellow with border line; "PENNA 1928" at top, with keystones on either side	A12-345	A-1 to approximately E25-000	
	1929	Embossed golden yellow on navy blue with border line; "1929 PENNA" at top, with keystones on either side	123-456	1 to 999-999	
	1929	Embossed golden yellow on navy blue with border line; "1929 PENNA" at top, with keystones on either side	A12-345	A-1 to approximately F24-000	
	1930	Embossed navy blue on golden yellow with border line; "1930 PENNA" at bottom, with keystones on either side	12345; A1234; 1A234; 12A34; 123A4; 1234A; AB123; 1AB23		Letters I, O, Q, T, W and X not used in serials; this practice continued until 1974.
	1931	Embossed golden yellow on navy blue with border line; "PENNA 1931" at bottom, with keystones on either side	12345; A1234; 1A234; 12A34; 123A4; 1234A; AB123; 1AB23		
	1932	Embossed navy blue on golden yellow with border line; "PENNA 1932" at top, with keystones on either side	12345; A1234; 1A234; 12A34; 123A4; 1234A; AB123; 1AB23		
	1933	Embossed golden yellow on navy blue with border line; "PENNA 1933" or "1933 PENNA" at top, with keystones on either side	12345; A1234; 1A234; 12A34; 123A4; 1234A; AB123		
	1934	Embossed navy blue on golden yellow with border line; "1934 PENNA" at bottom, with keystones on either side	12345; A1234; 1A234; 12A34; 123A4; 1234A; AB123		
	1935	Embossed golden yellow on navy blue with border line; "1935 PENNA" at bottom, with keystones on either side	12345; A1234; 1A234; 12A34; 123A4; 1234A; AB123; 1AB23		
	1936	Embossed navy blue on golden yellow; "1936 PENNA" at top, with keystones on either side	12345; A1234; 1A234; 12A34; 123A4; 1234A; AB123; 1AB23		
	1937	Embossed golden yellow on navy blue with state-shaped border; "1937 PENNA" at top	12345; A1234; 1A234; 12A34; 123A4; 1234A; AB123; 1AB23		Later plates had keystones on either side of the year and state abbreviation.
	1938	Embossed navy blue on golden yellow with state-shaped border; "1938 PENNA" at top	12345; A1234; 1A234; 12A34; 123A4; 1234A; AB123; 1AB23		
	1939–40	Embossed golden yellow on navy blue with state-shaped border; "1939 PENNA" at top	12345; A1234; 1A234; 12A34; 123A4; 1234A; AB123; 1AB23		Valid through March 31, 1940.
	1940–41	Embossed navy blue on golden yellow with state-shaped border; "1940 PENNA" at top	12345; A1234; 1A234; 12A34; 123A4; 1234A; AB123; 1AB23; 12AB3		
	1941–42	Embossed golden yellow on navy blue with state-shaped border; "1941 PENNA" at top; "EXP. 3-31-42" inside top border	12345; A1234; 1A234; 12A34; 123A4; 1234A; AB123; 1AB23; 12AB3		
	1942–44	Embossed navy blue on golden yellow with state-shaped border; "1942 PENNA" at top; "EXP. 3-31-43" inside top border	12345; A1234; 1A234; 12A34; 123A4; 1234A; AB123; 1AB23; 12AB3		Revalidated through March 31, 1944, with red tabs, due to metal conservation for World War II.
	1944–45	Embossed golden yellow on navy blue with state-shaped border; "1944 PENNA" at top; "EXP. 3-31-45" inside top border	12345; A1234; 1A234; 12A34; 123A4; 1234A; AB123; 1AB23		
	1945–46	Embossed navy blue on golden yellow with state-shaped border; "1945 PENNA" at top; "EXP. 3-31-46" inside top border	12345; A1234; 1A234; 12A34; 123A4; 1234A; AB123; 1AB23		
	1946–47	Embossed golden yellow on navy blue with state-shaped border; "1946 PENNA" at top; "EXP. 3-31-47" inside top border	12345; A1234; 1A234; 12A34; 123A4; 1234A; AB123; 1AB23; 12AB3		
	1947–48	Embossed navy blue on golden yellow with state-shaped border; "1947 PENNA" at top; "EXP. 3-31-48" inside top border	12345; A1234; 1A234; 12A34; 123A4; 1234A; AB123; 1AB23; 12AB3		
	1948–49	Embossed golden yellow on navy blue with state-shaped border; "1948 PENNA" at top; "EXP. 3-31-49" inside top border	12345; A1234; 1A234; 12A34; 123A4; 1234A; AB123; 1AB23; 12AB3		
	1949–50	Embossed navy blue on golden yellow with state-shaped border; "1949 PENNA" at top; "EXP. 3-31-50" inside top border	12345; A1234; 1A234; 12A34; 123A4; 1234A; AB123; 1AB23; 12AB3; 123AB		
	1950–51	Embossed golden yellow on navy blue with state-shaped border; "1950 PENNA" at top; "EXP. 3-31-51" inside top border	12345; A1234; 1A234; 12A34; 123A4; 1234A; AB123; 1AB23; 12AB3; 123AB		
	1951–52	Embossed navy blue on golden yellow with state-shaped border; "1951 PENNA" at top; "EXP. 3-31-52" inside top border	12345; A1234; 1A234; 12A34; 123A4; 1234A; AB123; 1AB23; 12AB3; 123AB; A123B		
	1952–53	Embossed golden yellow on navy blue with state-shaped border; "1952 PENNA" at top; "EXP. 3-31-53" inside top border	12345; A1234; 1A234; 12A34; 123A4; 1234A; AB123; 1AB23; 12AB3; 123AB; A123B		Only rear plates issued; this practice continues today.
	1953–54	Embossed navy blue on golden yellow with state-shaped border; "1953 PENNA" at top; "EXP. 3-31-54" inside top border	12345; A1234; 1A234; 12A34; 123A4; 1234A; AB123; 1AB23; 12AB3; 123AB; A123B		
	1954–55	Embossed golden yellow on navy blue with state-shaped border; "1954 PENNA" at top; "EXP. 3-31-55" inside top border	12345; A1234; 1A234; 12A34; 123A4; 1234A; AB123; 1AB23; 12AB3; 123AB; A123B; A12B3		
	1955–56	Embossed navy blue on golden yellow with state-shaped border; "1955 PENNA" at top; "EXP. 3-31-56" inside top border	12345; A1234; 1A234; 12A34; 123A4; 1234A; AB123; 1AB23; 12AB3; 123AB; A123B; A12B3; A1B23		
	1956–57	Embossed golden yellow on navy blue with state-shaped border; "1956 PENNA" at top; "EXP. 3-31-57" inside top border	12345; A1234; 1A234; 12A34; 123A4; 1234A; AB123; 1AB23; 12AB3; 123AB; A123B; A12B3; A1B23		Later plates used the thinner serial dies that would be used on most plates of the 1957–58 base. T and W briefly used as overflow letters in serials.
	1957–58	Embossed navy blue on golden yellow with state-shaped border; "1957 PENNA" at top; "EXP. 3-31-58" inside top border	12345; A1234; 1A234; 12A34; 123A4; 1234A; AB123; 1AB23; 12AB3; 123AB		
	1957–58	Embossed navy blue on golden yellow with state-shaped border; "1957 PENNA" at top; "EXP. 3-31-58" inside top border	123456	100000 to approximately 880000	Narrower serial dies.

=== 1958 to present ===
Only plates issued since 1999 are currently valid for display.

Image	Dates issued	Design	Slogan	Serial format	Serials issued	Notes
	1958–60	Yellow on blue with small keystone separator and state-shaped border	none	123-456	100-000 to 999-999	Sticker validation through 1964.
	1958–60	Yellow on blue with small keystone separator and state-shaped border	none	A12-345	A00-000 to Z99-999	Sticker validation through 1964.
	1960–63	Yellow on blue with small keystone separator and state-shaped border	none	123-45A	000-00A to 999-99Z	Sticker validation through 1964.
	1963–65	Yellow on blue with small keystone separator and state-shaped border	none	1A2-345	0A0-000 to approximately 0H8-000	Sticker validation through 1964.
	1965–66	Blue on yellow with small keystone separator and state-shaped border	none	123-456	100-000 to 999-999	First use of the full state name. Sticker validation through 1970.
	1965–66	Blue on yellow with small keystone separator and state-shaped border	none	A12-345	A00-000 to Z99-999	First use of the full state name. Sticker validation through 1970.
	1965–66	Blue on yellow with small keystone separator and state-shaped border	none	123-45A	000-00A to 999-99Z	First use of the full state name. Sticker validation through 1970.
	1966–69	Blue on yellow with small keystone separator and state-shaped border	none	1A2-345	0A0-000 to 9Z9-999	First use of the full state name. Sticker validation through 1970.
	1969–71	Blue on yellow with small keystone separator and state-shaped border	none	12A-345	00A-000 to approximately 62U-000	First use of the full state name. Sticker validation through 1970.
	1971–73	Yellow on blue with Liberty Bell separator	Bicentennial State '76	123-456	100-000 to 999-999	Awarded "Plate of the Year" for best new license plate of 1971 by the Automobile License Plate Collectors Association, the first time Pennsylvania was so honored. Letters T, W and X added to serials in 1974. Sticker validation through 1976.
	1971–73	Yellow on blue with Liberty Bell separator	Bicentennial State '76	A12-345	A00-000 to Z99-999	Awarded "Plate of the Year" for best new license plate of 1971 by the Automobile License Plate Collectors Association, the first time Pennsylvania was so honored. Letters T, W and X added to serials in 1974. Sticker validation through 1976.
	1971–73	Yellow on blue with Liberty Bell separator	Bicentennial State '76	123-45A	000-00A to 999-99Z	Awarded "Plate of the Year" for best new license plate of 1971 by the Automobile License Plate Collectors Association, the first time Pennsylvania was so honored. Letters T, W and X added to serials in 1974. Sticker validation through 1976.
	1971–73	Yellow on blue with Liberty Bell separator	Bicentennial State '76	1A2-345	0A0-000 to 9Z9-999	Awarded "Plate of the Year" for best new license plate of 1971 by the Automobile License Plate Collectors Association, the first time Pennsylvania was so honored. Letters T, W and X added to serials in 1974. Sticker validation through 1976.
	1973–76	Yellow on blue with Liberty Bell separator	Bicentennial State '76	12A-345	00A-000 to 99Z-999	Awarded "Plate of the Year" for best new license plate of 1971 by the Automobile License Plate Collectors Association, the first time Pennsylvania was so honored. Letters T, W and X added to serials in 1974. Sticker validation through 1976.
	1976–77	Yellow on blue with Liberty Bell separator	Bicentennial State '76	123-A45	000-A00 to approximately 650-H00	Awarded "Plate of the Year" for best new license plate of 1971 by the Automobile License Plate Collectors Association, the first time Pennsylvania was so honored. Letters T, W and X added to serials in 1974. Sticker validation through 1976.
	1977–79	Blue on reflective yellow with large keystone separator	Keystone State	123-456	100-000 to 999-999	Monthly staggered registration introduced 1979–80. Sticker validation through 2000.
	1977–79	Blue on reflective yellow with large keystone separator	Keystone State	A12-345	A00-000 to Z99-999	Monthly staggered registration introduced 1979–80. Sticker validation through 2000.
	1977–79	Blue on reflective yellow with large keystone separator	Keystone State	123-45A	000-00A to 999-99Z	Monthly staggered registration introduced 1979–80. Sticker validation through 2000.
	1977–79	Blue on reflective yellow with large keystone separator	Keystone State	1A2-345	0A0-000 to 9Z9-999	Monthly staggered registration introduced 1979–80. Sticker validation through 2000.
	1979–83	Blue on reflective yellow with large keystone separator	Keystone State	ABC-123	AAA-000 to GZZ-999	Monthly staggered registration introduced 1979–80. Sticker validation through 2000.
	1983–87	Reflective yellow on blue with large keystone separator	You've Got a Friend in Pennsylvania	ABC-123	HAA-000 to RZZ-999 ^{1}	Sticker validation through 2002. Letter U not used in the ABC-1234 serial format (in addition to I, O and Q).
	1987 – August 1991	Reflective yellow on blue with large keystone separator	Keystone State	ABC-123	SAA-000 to ZZZ-999 ^{1}	Sticker validation through 2002. Letter U not used in the ABC-1234 serial format (in addition to I, O and Q).
	August 1991 – September 1999	As above, but with smaller keystone separator	Keystone State	ABC-1234	AAA-0000 to approximately CEJ-9999 ^{1}	Sticker validation through 2002. Letter U not used in the ABC-1234 serial format (in addition to I, O and Q).
	September 1999 – December 2004	Dark blue on reflective white gradating to light blue on top and to light yellow on bottom	WWW.STATE.PA.US	ABC-1234	DAA-0000 to approximately FYC-9999 ^{1}	Sticker validation through 2017; plates validated electronically thereafter. Due to be replaced over the next few years.
	December 2004 – June; 2017	Dark blue on reflective white with navy blue on top and yellow on bottom	visitPA.com	ABC-1234	GBA-0000 to KLE-9999 ^{1}	A and E not used as second letter in serials. Sticker validation through 2017; plates validated electronically thereafter.
	June 2017 – May 2025	As above, but with state outline at top left	visitPA.com	ABC-1234	KLF-0000 to MYR-0199	Validated electronically. Issued concurrently with 'Let Freedom Ring' plates until supplies are exhausted.
	May 2025 – present	Dark blue on cream over image of Liberty Bell; Red state name at top, red slogan at bottom	Let Freedom Ring	ABC1234	MYR 0200 to NKZ 2272 (as of 10/20/2026)	Validated electronically. Zeros became slashed starting with this base.

Notes

- 1 Plus remakes of serials issued on previous bases.

=== Temporary plates ===
Unlike many states that issue paper or cardboard temporary license plates with a new registration until the permanent registration and plates comes in, Pennsylvania almost always issues the permanent plate right away, with a temporary tag in the rear window indicating the exact date the temporary tag expires, upon which it is removed or when the full-year registration sticker for the plate comes in, whichever comes first. (Some cars do get issued a paper temporary Pennsylvania plate, usually by those who live out-of-state buying a car in Pennsylvania who need the temporary tag until the vehicle title is transferred to the state they live in.) Until April 2000, new plates had a "T" sticker to denote a temporary tag on the plate until the full-year registration came in the mail with the regular registration sticker. Pennsylvania adopted the current system to combat criminals making counterfeit "T" stickers. For plates that already had the "T" stickers but were not issued yet to vehicles at the time of the change, Pennsylvania gave car dealerships and notaries plain white stickers to cover up the "T" tags so that the plates could still be used.

== Non-passenger plates ==
Image	Type	Serial format	Notes
	Antique Historic Car	1; 12; 123; 1234; A123; AB12; 12AB	
	Antique motorcycle	1; 12; 123; A12; 1A2; 12A; AB1; A1B	
	Antique vehicle	A12B	
	Apportioned bus	BN-12345	
	Apportioned truck	AB-12345	Began at AE-00000 in 2000. Current highest serial seen: AH-25310 (as of May 3, 2022).
	Bus	BA-12345	
	Circus-Carnival Truck	B/Z 12345	
	Classic Car	12345; C12345	
	Classic Motorcycle	C/L 123	
	Collectible Motorcycle	CM123	
	Collectible Vehicle	CV 1234	
	Dealer	H12-345H; J12-345J; K12-345K	Both letters are the same. Current highest serial seen: K67-595K (on March 3, 2022).
	Dealer – Farm Equipment	FE1234A	
	Dealer – Multi Purpose	MP1234A	
	Emergency Vehicle	EV-12345	Red serial and "EMERGENCY VEHICLE" legend on standard passenger design.
	Farm Truck	FM-1234A	
	Fire Department	FD-12345	This type was issued from 1968 to the mid-1980s; plates remained valid until 2007, when they were replaced with Emergency Vehicle plates.
	Fleet Transporter	FL1234A	
	Handicapped	P/D 1234A	
	Handicapped Motorcycle	P/D A12B	
	Hearing Impaired	HE-12345	
	Implement of Husbandry	IMP-1234	
	Limousine	LM-12345	This type was introduced in 1990, with serials beginning at LM-10000. Current highest serial seen: LM-31399 (on August 14, 2022).
	Mass Transit	M/T12345; MT-12345	
	Moped	AB123	
	Moped Dealer	1234	
	Motor Home	HB-12345	This type was introduced in 1977 as "House Car", changing to "Motor Home" circa 1990. Serials began at HC-10000; the HE series was reserved for Hearing Impaired plates. Current highest serial seen: HH-97907 (on May 11, 2022).
	Motorcycle	ABC12; 1234A; A1234; 1AB23	Current serial format introduced mid-2015.
	Motorcycle Dealer	123A	
	Municipal Government	MG-12345; 12345-MG; MG-1234A; M/G1234A	
	Municipal Motorcycle	MG123; MG12A	
	Official Use – Passenger	PA-12345; 12345-PA	Front and rear plates required. Serials PA-10000 through PA-29999 issued, followed by 10000-PA onwards.
	Official Use – Commercial	PA-12345; PA-1234A	Only rear plates required. Serials PA-30000 through PA-99999 issued, followed by PA-0000A onwards.
	Omnibus	OB-12345	Current serial format began at OB-10000 in 1974. Current highest serial seen: OB-96948 (on June 12, 2025).
	Permanent Trailer	PT-1234A; PT-123A4	Began at PT-0000A in 2001; reached PT-9999Z in early 2015, followed by PT-000A0 onwards. Current highest serial seen: PT-996P3 (on August 22, 2022).
	Repair Towing	RT-12345	
	Repossessor	RE-12345	
	Salvage Yard	WL-12345	
	School Bus	SC-12345	
	School Vehicle	SV-12345	
	Special Mobile Equipment	SME-123A; A123-SME	Used by heavy construction equipment or other utility vehicles that are street-legal but not eligible for Truck or Apportioned plates.
	State police	P/A 1234V	Current version introduced in 2022.
	Street Rod	1234 S/R	
	Taxi	TX-12345	This type was introduced in 1977, taxis using Bus plates beforehand. Current highest serial seen: TX-51112 (on August 15, 2022).
	Temporary In-Transit	1234-567	Paper plate, first issued in 2014.
	Trailer	XBC-1234	Sticker validation through 2022, due to the 5 year registration. Current highest serial seen: XRH-8376 (on July 3, 2025).
	Trailer Dealer	TD-1234A	
	Transporter	DT-12345	
	Truck	CA-12345 12345-CA YA-12345 ZA-12345 YBC-1234 ZBC-1234 VBC1234	1978-83: CA-10000 to CZ-99999 1983-86: 10000-CA to roughly 98283-CJ 1986-99: YA-10000 to roughly ZV-98247 1999-2011: YAA-0000 to YZZ-9999, when U is also omitted besides I, O, Q. 2011-2025: ZBA-0000 to approximately ZZH-7700. VBA0000 started in summer 2025. Let Freedom Ring Truck Series, originally being produced concurrently with Z series plates, current highest serial seen: VBB-0163 on 2025-07-10. Y series plates due to be replaced over the next few years.
	Watercraft Trailer / Dealer	WD12345	

== Optional plates ==
Pennsylvania offers many optional "special organizational" and "special fund" license plates. Special fund license plate proceeds are directed to organizations involved with their respective causes.

Image	Type	Serial format	Notes
	4-H Youth Program	4/H 12345	
	Amateur Radio	FCC call sign	
	American Legion	A/L 12345	Available for issue to members of the American Legion
	Animal Friends	12345 A/F	
	Bucknell University	B/U 12345	
	Carnegie-Mellon University		
	Commonwealth Court	C/C 1	
	Conserve Wild Resources – owl	W/R12345; W/R1234A	No longer issued, but still valid with continuous registration.
	Conserve Wild Resources – river otter	R/C1234; R/C123A; R/C12A3; R/C1A23	No longer issued, but still valid with continuous registration.
	Conserve Wild Resources – river otter	R/C12345	Revised design.
	Disabled Veteran	DV-12345	
	Emergency Medical Services	EM 1234	Issued to licensed Emergency Medical Technicians and Paramedics in Pennsylvania.
	Flagship Niagara	F/N1234; F/N123A	Awarded "Plate of the Year" for best new optional license plate of 1995 by the Automobile License Plate Collectors Association, the second time Pennsylvania was so honored. Co-recipient with Texas. No longer issued due to poor visibility, but still valid.
	Fire Fighter	FF 1234	Issued to professional Fire Fighters in Pennsylvania. See VF plate for volunteers.
	Fort Mifflin	12345F/M	
	Geneva College	G/C12345	
	Harleysville Community Fire Co.	12345H/F	
	Harmonville Fire Company No. 1	12345P/T	
	Hartsville Fire Company	12345H/F	
	Heritage Jeep Alliance	12345H/R	
	Little League Baseball	12345L/L	
	Lincoln University	L1234U	
	Motorcycle Vanity	varies	
	Mercedes-Benz Club of America	12345M/B	
	National MS Society	12345M/S	
	National Police Defense Foundation	12345 P/F	
	Planned Parenthood of Pennsylvania	12345 P/P	
	Passenger Vanity	varies	
	Pennsylvania Equine Council	12345 P/E	Available for issue to members of the Pennsylvania Equine Council who have paid their yearly dues for a minimum or 1 year. Application to the PEC available on their website.
	Pennsylvania State University	A12-34P	
	Philadelphia Flyers Wives Charities	FL12345	
	Preserve Our Heritage	R/R1234; R/R123A; R/R12A3; R/R1A23	
	Press Photographer	PP 123	Letters within keystone. Issued to full-time newspaper, newsreel and television photographers. Front and rear plates required.
	Retired Legislator	P/A 12345	
	Save Wild Animals	P/Z1234; P/Z123A; P/Z12A3; P/Z1A23; P/ZA123B	No longer issued, but still valid with continuous registration.
	Slippery Rock University	S/R 01234	
	State Representative	HR 123	Letters within keystone.
	State Senator	PA 12	Letters within keystone.
	Steel Worker	S/W 12345	
	Superior Court	S/C 12	
	Supreme Court	S/U 12	
	Temple University	T1234U	
	U.S. Congress	U/S C 1	
	U.S. Senate	U/S S 1	
	University of Pennsylvania	12345 U/P	
	University of Pittsburgh	U1234P	
	Villanova University	V/U 12345; 12345 V/U	
	We The People	U/S 12345	Limited edition plate issued in 1987 only, but still valid with renewal.
	Women in Transition Inc.	12345 W/T	
	Volunteer Firefighter	VF 12345	Issued to volunteer Fire Fighters in Pennsylvania.

=== Military plates ===
Image	Type	First issued	Serial format	Notes
	Air Force Cross	2012	12345A/C	
	Bronze Star	2012	12345B/Z	
	Bronze Star for Valor	2012	12345B/V	
	Combat Action Badge	2014	02345C/O	
	Combat Action Medal	2014	62345C/O	
	Combat Action Ribbon	2014	42345C/O	
	Combat Infantryman Badge	2014	22345C/O	
	Combat Medical Badge	2014	82345C/O	
	Distinguished Flying Cross	2012	12345F/C	
	Distinguished Service Cross	2012	22345S/C	
	Ex-Prisoner of War	1982	POW-123; 123-POW	
	Expeditionary Forces Veteran	1995	E/F1234	
	Gold Star Family	2006	G/S/F1234	
	Korean Defense Service Medal	2010	12345K/D	
	Korean War Veteran	1993	K/V12345	
	Legion of Merit	2019	12345L/M	
	Medal of Honor	1982	ABC-MOH	The letters to the left of the graphic are the initials of the honoree.
	Navy Cross	2012	12345N/C	
	Operation Enduring Freedom Veteran	2005	12345E/F	
	Operation Iraqi Freedom Veteran	2005	12345I/F	
	Pearl Harbor Survivor	1990	P/H S1234	
	Pennsylvania National Guard	2018	92345A/D	
	Persian Gulf War Veteran	1993	P/G12345	
	Presidential Service Badge	2019	12345P/B	
	Purple Heart	1986	P/H12345	
	Silver Star	2012	12345S/I	
	Soldier's Medal	2019	12345S/M	
	U.S. Air Force	2017	42345A/D	
	U.S. Air Force Veteran	2009	12345A/F	
	U.S. Army	2017	02345A/D	
	U.S. Army Veteran	2009	12345A/R	
	U.S. Coast Guard	2017	82345A/D	
	U.S. Coast Guard Veteran	2009	12345C/G	
	U.S. Marine Corps	2017	62345A/D	
	U.S. Marine Corps Veteran	2009	12345M/C	
	U.S. Merchant Marine	2013	12345M/M	
	U.S. Military Airborne Units	2013	22345M/A	
	U.S. Navy	2017	22345A/D	
	U.S. Navy Veteran	2009	12345N/A	
	Veteran	2005	12345U/S	
	Veteran Motorcycle	2004	V1234	
	Veterans of an Allied Foreign Country	2019	12345V/A	Issued to registrants who were citizens of a foreign country that allied with the U.S. in a military conflict, and who served in a military branch of that foreign country during the conflict.
	Vietnam War Veteran	1999	V/W12345	
	World War II Veteran	1995	W/W12345	
