= Aluminum can =

Small container, typically for drinks

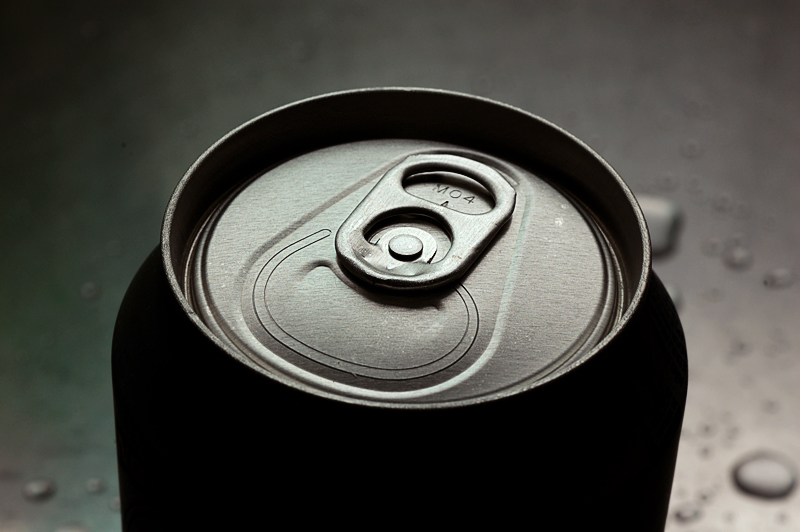
Aluminum can with a pull tab

An aluminum can (British English: aluminium can) is a single-use container for packaging made primarily of an aluminum exterior with an epoxy resin or polymer coated interior. It is commonly used for food and beverages such as olives and soup but also for products such as oil, chemicals, and other liquids. The global production amount of aluminum cans is 180 billion units annually and constitutes the largest single use of aluminum globally.

== Usage ==
Use of aluminum in cans began in 1957. Aluminum offers greater malleability, resulting in ease of manufacture; this gave rise to the two-piece can, where all but the top of the can is simply stamped out of a single piece of aluminum, rather than constructed from two pieces of steel. The inside of the can is lined by spray coating an epoxy lacquer or polymer to protect the aluminum from being corroded by acidic contents such as carbonated beverages and imparting a metallic taste to the beverage. The epoxy may contain bisphenol A. A label is either printed directly on the side of the can or will be glued to the outside of the curved surface, indicating its contents.

Most aluminum cans are made of two pieces. The bottom and body are "drawn" or "drawn and ironed" from a flat plate or shallow cup. After filling, the can "end" is sealed onto the top of the can. This is supplemented by a sealing compound to ensure that the top is air tight.

The advantages of aluminum over steel (tinplate) cans include;

- light weight
- competitive cost
- usage of easy-open aluminum ends: no need for a can opener
- clean appearance
- aluminum does not rust
- easy to press into shape

The easy-open aluminum end for beverage cans was developed by Alcoa in 1962 for the Pittsburgh Brewing Company and is now used in nearly all of the canned beer market.

== Recycling ==
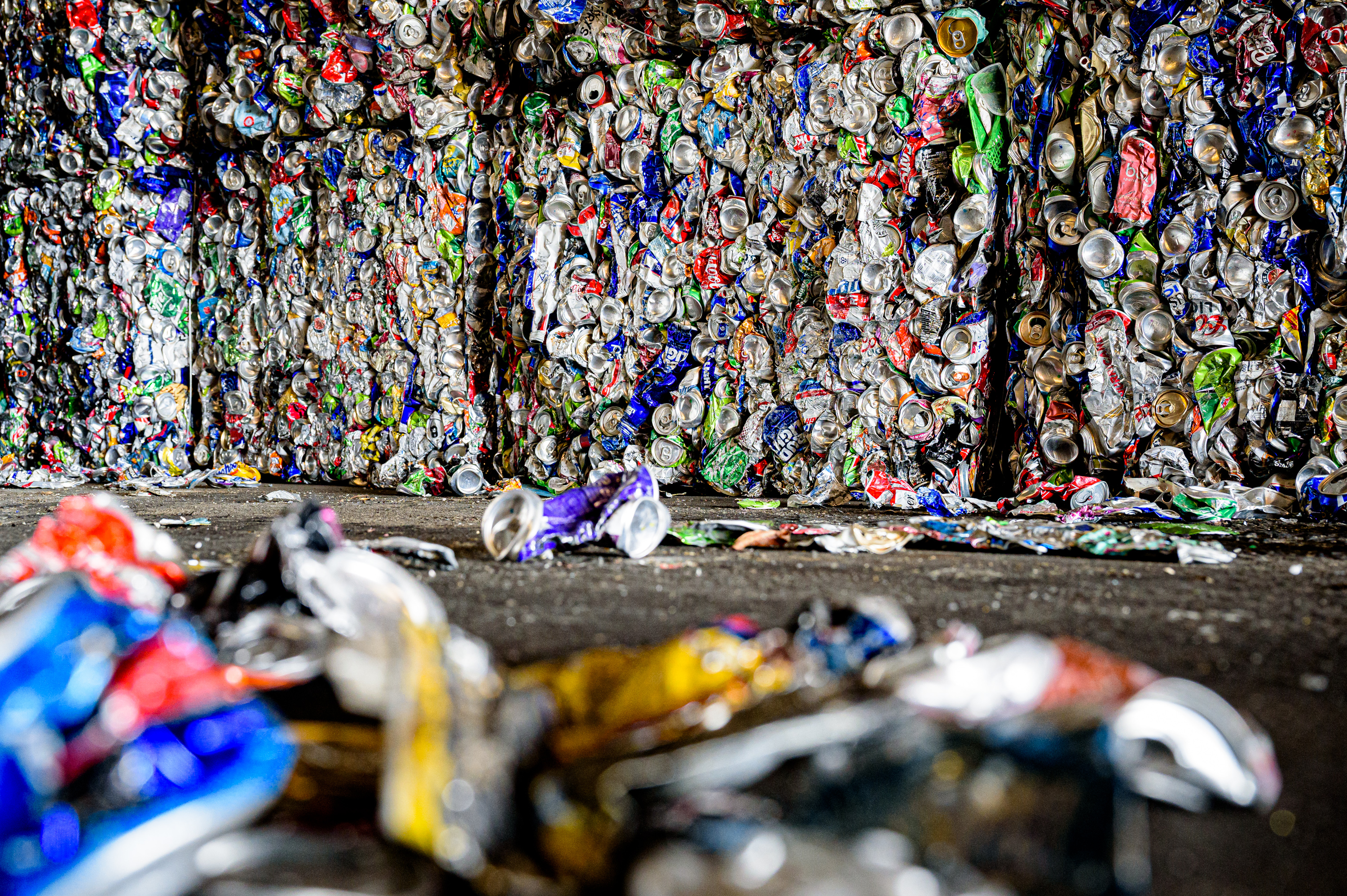
Aluminum cans pressed into bales

Aluminum cans can be made with recycled aluminum. In 2017, 3.8 million tons of aluminum were generated in the US of which 0.62 million tons were recycled - a recycling rate of 16%. According to estimates from the Aluminum Association, a large amount of aluminium remains unrecycled in the US, where roughly $700 million worth of cans end up in landfills each year. In 2012, 92% of the aluminum beverage cans sold in Switzerland were recycled. Cans are the most recycled beverage container, at a rate of 69% worldwide.

One issue is that the top of the can is made from a blend of aluminum and magnesium to increase its strength. When the can is melted for recycling, the mixture is unsuitable for either the top or the bottom/side. Instead of mixing recycled metal with more aluminum (to soften it) or magnesium (to harden it), a new approach uses annealing to produce an alloy that works for both.

The aluminum can is also considered the most valuable recyclable material in an average recycling bin. It is estimated that Americans throw away nearly 1 billion dollars a year in wasted aluminum. The aluminum industry pays nearly 800 million dollars a year for recycled aluminum since it is so versatile.

Because of the advantages of aluminium packaging (shelf life, durability, food grade factor) over plastics, it is considered an alternative to PET bottles, with the possibility of replacing the majority of them in the next decades.

== Cans as collectibles ==
Some people collect cans as a hobby. Can collections can be exclusive to one sector only, eg., some collectors may collect soda cans only, while others may dedicate themselves to collecting beer cans or oil cans exclusively, but some collectors may collect cans regardless of the type of can.

One aspect that may make someone interested in building a can collection as a hobby is the variety of cans available worldwide promoting such things as films, musical albums and tours, sporting teams and events, countries, ideals and even some non-food or petrol-oriented brands and companies.

Celebrities can also be featured on collectible cans; such was the case of tennis player Andre Agassi, who had a set of four Pepsi Max soda cans dedicated to him in 1996.

Davide Andreani of Italy is in the Guinness Book of World Records for having the largest collection of soda cans of one specific brand in the world, with over 20,000 cans in his collection. According to a website named canmuseum.com, the largest collection of Pepsi Cola cans belongs to Chris Cavaletti, also of Italy, who owned 12,402 Pepsi Cola cans from 81 countries as of 2022, while the largest collection of Coca-Cola soda cans belonged to Gary Feng of Canada with 11,308 variations of the Coca-Cola cans from 108 countries collected, with William B. Christensen of the United States owning the largest collection of beer cans with 75,000 from 125 countries and Allan Green, of the United States also, with the largest collection of wine cans, at 449.

Some webpages are dedicated to the hobby of can collecting.

== Gallery ==
=== Images ===
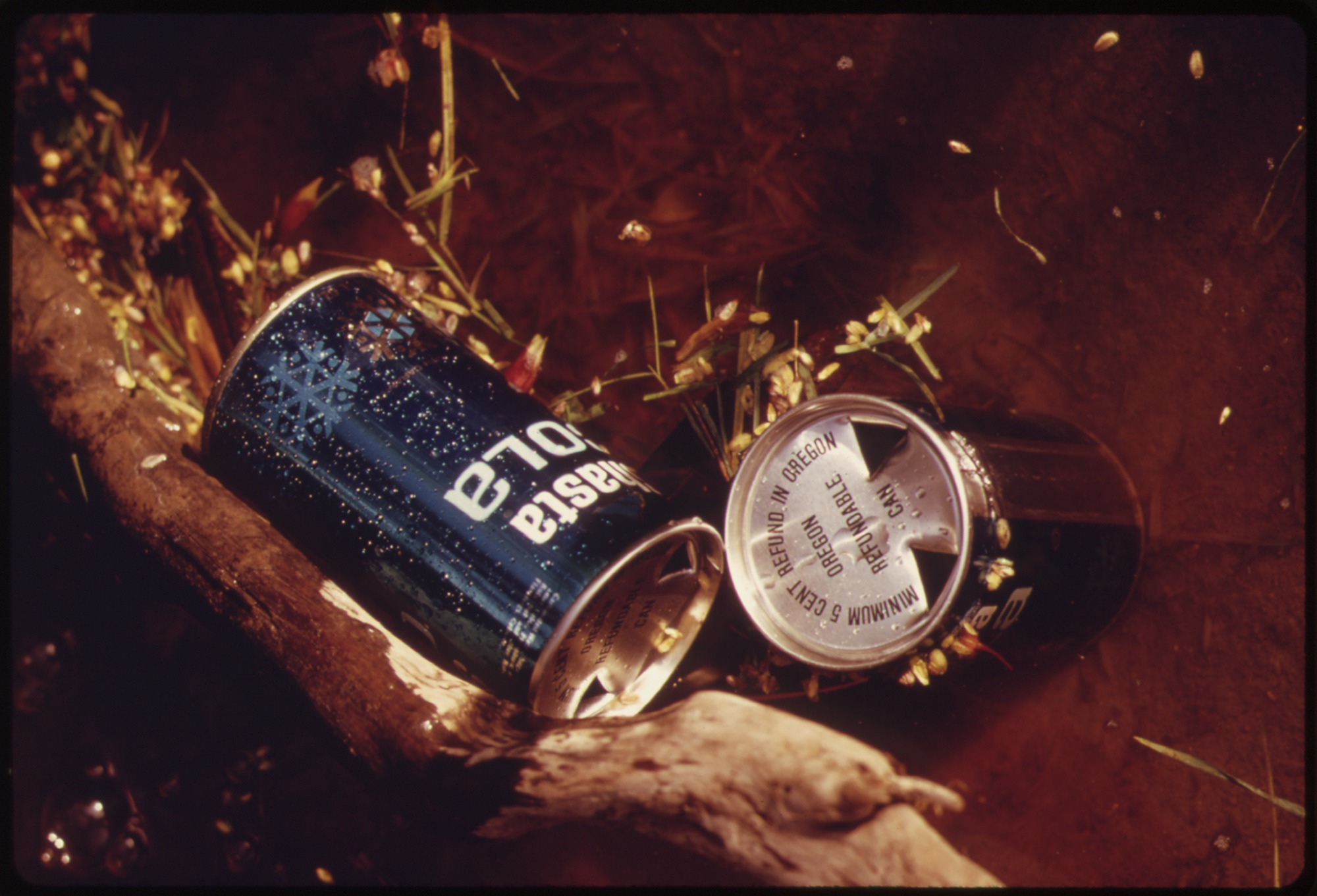
Discarded aluminum beverage cans marked with five-cent refund labeling per the Oregon Bottle Bill, early 1970's.

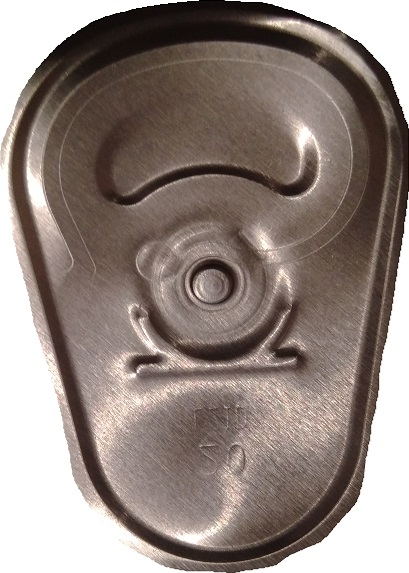
An aluminum soda can opening mechanism viewed from the inside of the can.

=== A video ===
This video describes the engineering choices underlying the design of a beverage can.

== See also ==
- The Aluminum Association
- Aluminium recycling
- Beverage can
- Can collecting
- Oil can

== Bibliography ==
- Soroka, W, "Fundamentals of Packaging Technology", IoPP, 2002, ISBN 1-930268-25-4
- Yam, K. L., "Encyclopedia of Packaging Technology", John Wiley & Sons, 2009, ISBN 978-0-470-08704-6
