= Vehicle registration plates of Oregon =

Oregon vehicle license plates

Oregon
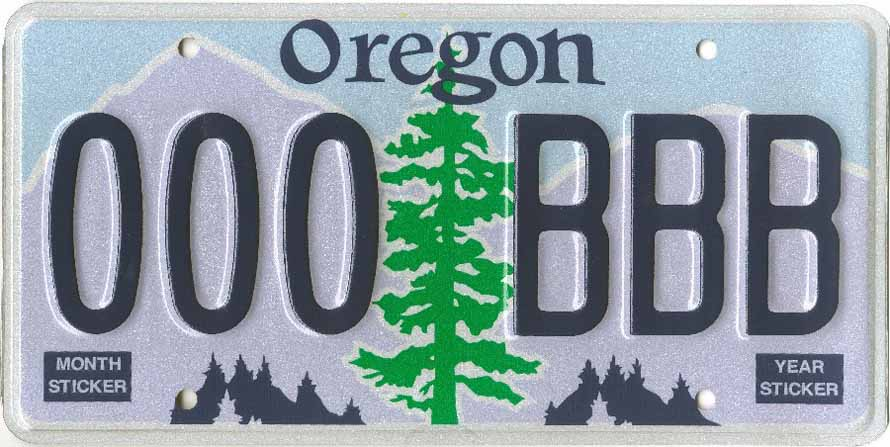

Current series
- Size: 12 in × 6 in 30 cm × 15 cm
- Material: Aluminum
- Serial format: 123 ABC
- Introduced: November 1989

Availability
- Issued by: Oregon Department of Transportation, Driver & Motor Vehicle Services
- Manufactured by: Irwin-Hodson Company, Portland, Oregon

History
- First issued: August 1, 1911 (pre-state plates from 1905 through July 31, 1911)

The U.S. state of Oregon first required its residents to register their motor vehicles in 1905. Registrants provided their own license plates for display until 1911, when the state began to issue plates.

As of 2026, plates are issued by the Oregon Department of Transportation through its Driver & Motor Vehicle Services branch. Front and rear plates are required for most classes of vehicles, while only rear plates are required for motorcycles and trailers.

== Passenger baseplates ==
=== 1911 to 1949 ===
No slogans were used on passenger plates during the period covered by this subsection.

Image	Dates issued	Design	Serial format	Serials issued	Notes
	1911	Embossed black serial on yellow plate with border line; vertical "ORE" and "1911" at left and right respectively	1234	1 to approximately 6200	
	1912	Embossed black serial on light green plate with border line; vertical "ORE" and "1912" at left and right respectively	1234	1 to approximately 9999	
	1913	Black serial on silver plate; vertical "ORE" and "1913" at left and right respectively	12345	1 to approximately 14000	
	1914	Debossed white serial on blue plate; vertical "ORE" and "1914" at left and right respectively	12345	1 to approximately 16500	
	1915	Debossed black serial on yellow plate; vertical "ORE" and "1915" at left and right respectively	12345	1 to approximately 22500	
	1916	Embossed white serial on dark red plate; vertical "ORE" and "1916" at left and right respectively	12345	1 to approximately 34000	
	1917	Embossed white serial on green plate; vertical "ORE" and "1917" at left and right respectively	12345	1 to approximately 49000	
	1918	Embossed black serial on light blue plate; vertical "ORE" and "1918" at left and right respectively	12345	1 to approximately 70000	
	1919	Embossed black serial on orange plate; vertical "ORE" and "1919" at left and right respectively	12345	1 to approximately 84000	
	1920	Embossed white serial on red plate; "ORE 1920" at right	123456	1 to approximately 104000	
	1921	Embossed white serial on green plate; "ORE 1921" at right	123456	1 to approximately 119000	
	1922	Embossed black serial on golden yellow plate; "ORE 1922" at right	123456	1 to approximately 135000	
	1923	Embossed white serial on dark blue plate; "ORE 1923" at right	123456	1 to approximately 168000	
	1924	Embossed white serial on red plate; "ORE 1924" at right	123-456	1 to approximately 197-000	
	1925	Embossed black serial on yellow plate; "ORE 1925" at right	123-456	1 to approximately 220-000	
	1926	Embossed white serial on black plate; "ORE 1926" at right	123-456	1 to approximately 236-000	
	1927	Embossed white serial on black plate; "OREGON-1927" at bottom	123-456	1 to approximately 261-000	First use of the full state name.
	1928	Embossed black serial on white plate; "OREGON-1928" at bottom	123-456	1 to approximately 256-000	
	January 1, 1929 – June 30, 1930	Embossed white serial on black plate; "OREGON-1929" at top	123-456	1 to approximately 330-000	Validated from January 1 through June 30, 1930, with windshield sticker.
	July 1, 1930 – June 30, 1931	Embossed orange serial on black plate; "OREGON EXPIRES JUNE 30 1931" at bottom	123-456	1 to approximately 296-000	
	July 1, 1931 – June 30, 1932	Embossed white serial on black plate; "OREGON JUNE 30 1932" at bottom	123-456	1 to approximately 265-000	
	July 1, 1932 – June 30, 1933	Embossed white serial on black plate with border line; "OREGON JUNE 30 1933" at top	123-456	1 to approximately 250-000	
	July 1 – December 31, 1933	Embossed black serial on golden yellow plate with border line; "OREGON DEC. 31 1933" at bottom	123-456	1 to approximately 218-000	
	1934	Embossed black serial on gray plate with border line; "OREGON-1934" at bottom	123-456	1 to approximately 249-000	
	1935	Embossed yellow serial on black plate with border line; "OREGON-1935" at top	123-456	1 to approximately 272-000	
	1936	Embossed black serial on silver plate with border line; "OREGON-1936" at bottom	123-456	1 to approximately 276-000	
	1937	Embossed white serial on black plate with border line; "OREGON-1937" at top	123-456	1 to approximately 293-000	
	1938	Embossed black serial on silver plate with border line; "OREGON-1938" at top	123-456	1 to approximately 327-000	
	1939	Embossed black serial on yellow plate with border line; "OREGON-1939" at bottom	123-456	1 to approximately 344-000	
	1940	Embossed blue serial on white plate with border line; "OREGON-1940" at top	123-456	1 to approximately 359-000	
	1941	Embossed white serial on green plate with border line; "19 OREGON 41" at bottom	123-456	1 to approximately 390-000	
	1942–45	Embossed white serial on blue plate with border line; "19 OREGON 42" at bottom	123-456	1 to approximately 495-000	Revalidated for 1943, 1944 and 1945 with windshield stickers, due to metal conservation for World War II.
	1946	Embossed black serial on gray plate with border line; "46 OREGON 46" at bottom	123-456	1 to approximately 480-000	Only rear plates issued due to ongoing metal shortages. A windshield sticker was carried at the front of the vehicle.
	1947	Embossed black serial on unpainted aluminum plate with border line; "47 OREGON 47" at bottom	123-456	1 to approximately 458-000	
	1948	Embossed red serial on unpainted aluminum plate with border line; "48 OREGON 48" at top	123-456	1 to approximately 511-000	
	1949	Embossed black serial on unpainted aluminum plate with border line; "19 OREGON 49" at bottom	123-456	1 to approximately 567-000	

=== 1950 to present ===
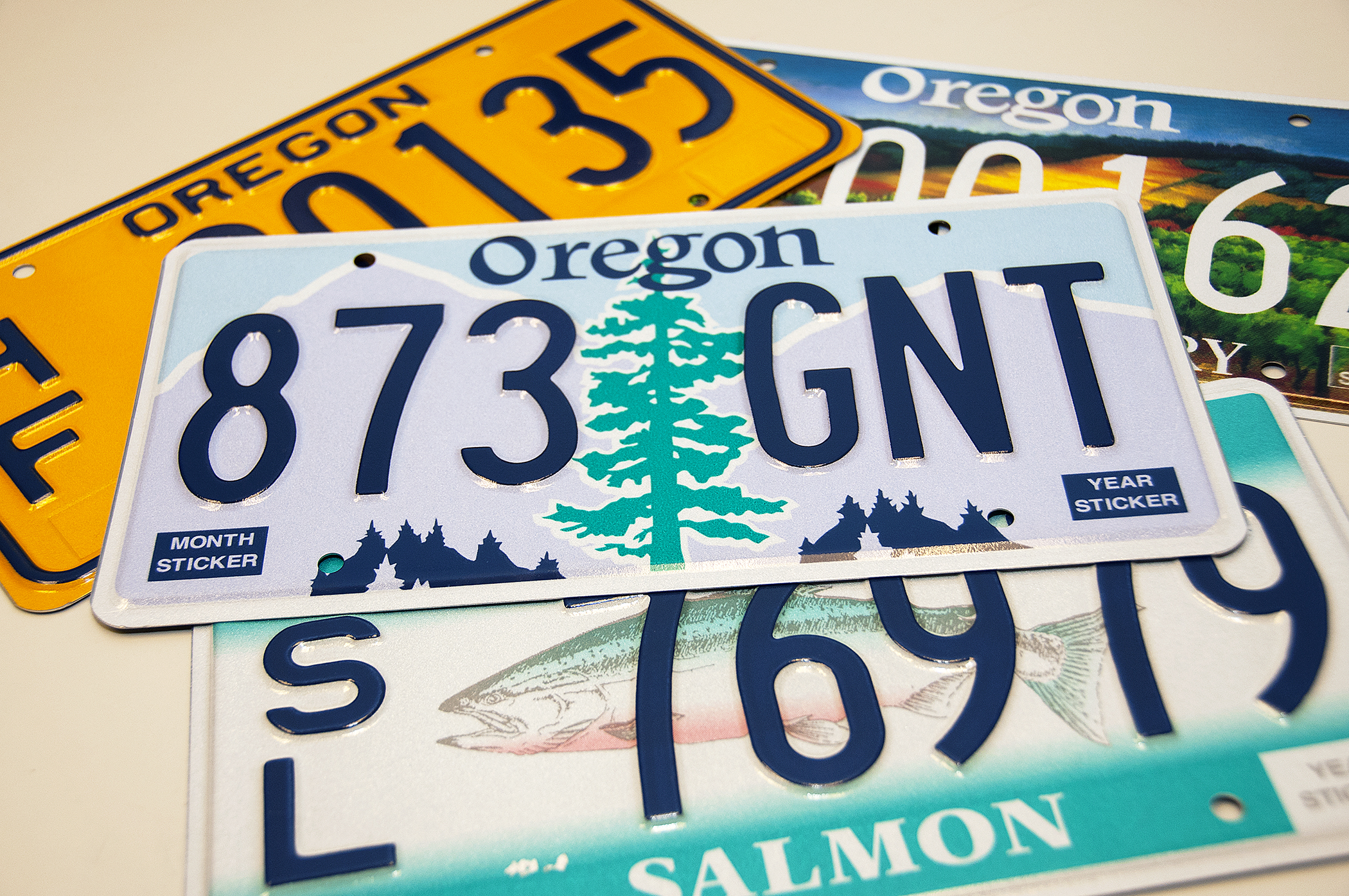
Some of Oregon's current license plate designs

In 1956, the United States, Canada, and Mexico came to an agreement with the American Association of Motor Vehicle Administrators, the Automobile Manufacturers Association and the National Safety Council that standardized the size for license plates for vehicles (except those for motorcycles) at 6 inches (15 cm) in height by 12 inches (30 cm) in width, with standardized mounting holes. The 1955 (dated 1956) issue was the first Oregon license plate that complied with these standards.

All plates from 1955 until present are still valid, provided they are displayed on the vehicle to which they were originally issued and the vehicle has been continuously registered.

Image	Dates issued	Design	Slogan	Serial format	Serials issued	Notes
	1950	Embossed black serial on unpainted aluminum plate with border line; month of expiration, "OREGON" and "50" or "51" at top	none	123-456	1 to 710-000	Monthly staggered registration introduced. Dated plates were generally issued to existing registrants, while all undated plates were issued to new registrants. All were revalidated with tabs each year until 1955.
	1951–54	As above, but without "50" or "51"	none	123-456	710-001 to approximately 995-000	Monthly staggered registration introduced. Dated plates were generally issued to existing registrants, while all undated plates were issued to new registrants. All were revalidated with tabs each year until 1955.
	1955	Embossed golden yellow serial on blue plate with border line; month of expiration, "OREGON" and "56" at top	none	1A-1234	Letter corresponds to month of expiration (see right)	Letters A through M (excluding I) were used for January through December respectively, followed by letters N through Z (excluding O). All 1955–59 plates were revalidated with tabs each year until 1960 and with stickers thereafter, while all "Pacific Wonderland" plates were revalidated with stickers.
	1956–59	As above, but without "56"	none	1A-1234	Letter corresponds to month of expiration (see right)	Letters A through M (excluding I) were used for January through December respectively, followed by letters N through Z (excluding O). All 1955–59 plates were revalidated with tabs each year until 1960 and with stickers thereafter, while all "Pacific Wonderland" plates were revalidated with stickers.
	1960–63	As above, but with shorter dies for the serial, state name and month of expiration	"PACIFIC WONDERLAND" at bottom	1A-1234	Letter corresponds to month of expiration (see right)	Letters A through M (excluding I) were used for January through December respectively, followed by letters N through Z (excluding O). All 1955–59 plates were revalidated with tabs each year until 1960 and with stickers thereafter, while all "Pacific Wonderland" plates were revalidated with stickers.
	1964–73	Embossed golden yellow serial on blue plate; border line around plate and around registration year sticker spot at bottom right; "OREGON" centered at bottom; month of expiration at bottom left	none	ABC 123	First letter corresponds to month of expiration	Letters A through M (excluding I) were used for January through December respectively.
	1973–85	Embossed blue serial on golden yellow plate; border line around plate and around registration year sticker spot at bottom right; "OREGON" centered at bottom; month of expiration at bottom left	none	ABC 123	First letter corresponds to month of expiration	Serials for each month continued from where the 1964–73 plates left off.
	1985 – June; 1988	As above, but without month of expiration and sticker spot border line	none	ABC 123	NAA 001 to PDM 999	Month coding discontinued.
	July; 1988 – November 1989	Embossed dark blue serial on mountain skyline with pale lavender mountains, light khaki sky and pale green Douglas Fir in the center; "Oregon" screened in pale blue centered at top	none	ABC 123	PDN 001 to QNL 999	Awarded "Plate of the Year" for best new license plate of 1988 by the Automobile License Plate Collectors Association, the first time Oregon was so honored.
	November 1989 – February 2004	Embossed dark blue serial on mountain skyline with lavender mountains, light blue sky and dark green Douglas Fir in the center; "Oregon" screened in dark blue centered at top	none	ABC 123	QNM 001 to ZZZ 999	Same design as previous, but with the colors changed in response to public criticism of the original colors.
	February 2004 – present	Embossed dark blue serial on mountain skyline with lavender mountains, light blue sky and dark green Douglas Fir in the center; "Oregon" screened in dark blue centered at top	none	123 ABC	001 BAA to 999 REN (as of June 22, 2026)	No change to design or colors. Formatting changed to numbers first. 'A' series of serials skipped to avoid confusion with optional Oregon Trail plates, 'I' and O' series of serials skipped to avoid confusion with ones or zeroes respectively.

== Optional plates ==
Image	Type	Dates issued	Design	Serial format	Serials issued	Notes
	Oregon Trail	1993–2000	Black on blue, yellow and green background. Embossed serials.	123 ABC	001 AAA to 999 ASZ	Featured a Covered Wagon print. Printing of plates to this design ceased in 1998, but the design continued to be issued to vehicle owners requesting it until the supply of pre-printed plates ran out, circa early 2000.
	Salmon	1998–2021	Dark blue on multicolored background. Embossed serials. Discontinued September 1, 2021.	S/L 12345	S/L 00001 to S/L 93326 (as of May 8, 2021)	$30 surcharge supports the Oregon Watershed Enhancement Board and the Oregon Parks and Recreation Department and is charged at each renewal time (every two years). First available in February 1998, the Salmon design has been less popular than had been expected, and by 2002 had only raised about one-third as much revenue as originally predicted.
	Salmon	2021–present	White on multicolored background. Surface-printed serials. Redesigned in 2021, released September 1, 2021	S/M 12345	S/M 00001 to present	$30 surcharge supports the Oregon Watershed Enhancement Board and the Oregon Parks and Recreation Department and is charged at each renewal time (every two years). First available in February 1998, the Salmon design has been less popular than had been expected, and by 2002 had only raised about one-third as much revenue as originally predicted.
	Crater Lake Centennial	2002–2022	White on multicolored background. Surface-printed serials. Discontinued September 9, 2022.	C/L 12345	C/L 00001 to C/L 99999	Awarded "Plate of the Year" for best new license plate of 2002 by the Automobile License Plate Collectors Association, the second time Oregon was so honored. Surcharge supports Crater Lake National Park.
	Crater Lake Centennial	2002–2022	White on multicolored background. Surface-printed serials. Discontinued September 9, 2022.	C/K 12345	C/K 00001 to C/K 99999	Awarded "Plate of the Year" for best new license plate of 2002 by the Automobile License Plate Collectors Association, the second time Oregon was so honored. Surcharge supports Crater Lake National Park.
	Crater Lake Centennial	2002–2022	White on multicolored background. Surface-printed serials. Discontinued September 9, 2022.	C/A 12345	C/A 00001 to C/A 99999	Awarded "Plate of the Year" for best new license plate of 2002 by the Automobile License Plate Collectors Association, the second time Oregon was so honored. Surcharge supports Crater Lake National Park.
	Crater Lake Centennial	2002–2022	White on multicolored background. Surface-printed serials. Discontinued September 9, 2022.	C/B 12345	C/B 00001 to approx. C/B 44000	Awarded "Plate of the Year" for best new license plate of 2002 by the Automobile License Plate Collectors Association, the second time Oregon was so honored. Surcharge supports Crater Lake National Park.
	Crater Lake	2022–present	White on multicolored background. Surface-printed serials. Redesigned in 2022, released September 9, 2022.	C/B 12345	C/B 44001 to present	Surcharge supports Crater Lake National Park.
	Cultural Trust	2006–2021	Black on multicolored background. Embossed serials. Discontinued October 1, 2021.	C/U 12345	C/U 00001 to present	Surcharge supports the Oregon Cultural Trust.
	Cultural Trust	2021–present	White on multicolored background. Embossed serials. Redesigned in 2021, released October 1, 2021	C/U 12345	C/U 00001 to present	Surcharge supports the Oregon Cultural Trust.
	Honoring Their Sacrifice	2009-present	As current passenger base, but with a picture of the State of Oregon with an American Flag in the center behind a firefighter and police officer replacing the two left-most serials.	A BCD		Surcharge supports the Oregon Law Enforcement Memorial Trust Fund.
	Pacific Wonderland	2009–present	Gold on blue. Embossed serials.	9A-1234	9P-0001 to 9Z-9999	Special re-issue of 1960–63 passenger base to celebrate Oregon's 150 years of statehood. Surcharge supports the Oregon State Capitol Foundation and the Oregon Historical Society. Originally limited to 40,000 plates; increased to 80,000 in 2015.
	Pacific Wonderland	2009–present	Gold on blue. Embossed serials.	0A-1234	0A-0001 to 0F-4281 (as of September 3, 2024)	Special re-issue of 1960–63 passenger base to celebrate Oregon's 150 years of statehood. Surcharge supports the Oregon State Capitol Foundation and the Oregon Historical Society. Originally limited to 40,000 plates; increased to 80,000 in 2015.
	Higher Education	2005–present	As current passenger base, but with school logo replacing two left-most serials. Embossed serials.	A BCD		Surcharge supports the school of choice. Available for EOU, OSU, U of O, UP, and Willamette.
	Share the Road	2008–present	White and yellow text on blue background. Surface-printed serials.	ABCD		Surcharge supports The Street Trust and Cycle Oregon.
	Wine Country	May 14, 2012 – present	White text on multi-colored background. Surface-printed serials.	W/C 12345	W/C 00001 to W/C 62360 (as of August 6, 2024)	Surcharge supports "agricultural and culinary tourism".
	Keep Kids Safe	October 16, 2012 – early 2015	White text on blue burst background with two children in front of red heart. Surface-printed serials.	ABCD		Surcharge supported child abuse prevention programs. Production discontinued October 31, 2014 due to low sales.
	Portland Trail Blazers	September 1, 2016 – present	Black on white background, with Trail Blazer colors around border. Embossed serials.	T/B 12345	T/B 00001 to T/B 46061 (as of July 10, 2024)	The design includes the Trail Blazers pin wheel between the stacked TB and the numbers, 'ripcity' at the bottom and red, black and gray stripes at the top. Also available as a vanity plate and as an amateur radio operator (ham) plate.
	Coastal Playground	February 1, 2019 – present	White on two-shade-blue background, with mother gray whale and calf swimming just below surface of ocean; small lighthouse at upper left.	G/W 12345	G/W 00001 to G/W 34740 (as of August 25, 2024)	Surcharge supports Oregon State University's Marine Mammal Institute.
	University of Oregon	April 1, 2019–present	Yellow on green background, the mascot, the duck, is seen drawn on the left side and the team name is printed at the bottom.	U/O 12345		Surcharge supports the University of Oregon
	Smokey Bear	August 1, 2019 – present	White on forest green background, changing to light green in the shape of a forest silhouette at top, with portion of face of Smokey Bear at left and "Keep Oregon Green" along the bottom.	S/B 12345	S/B 00001 to S/B 77683 (as of August 6, 2024)	Awarded "Plate of the Year" for best new license plate of 2019 by the Automobile License Plate Collectors Association, the third time Oregon was so honored. Surcharge, paid partly in the form of a voucher purchased from the non-profit Keep Oregon Green Association, supports that organization's efforts to reduce instances of human-caused wildfires.
	Watch for Wildlife	May 4, 2022 – present	Dark blue on multicolored background, with a mule deer at left and Mount Hood prominently in the righthand background	W/W 12345	W/W 00001 to W/W 27005 (as of Sept 7, 2024)	Surcharge supports the Oregon Wildlife Foundation.
	Pollinator paradise	November 1, 2023 – present	White on multicolored background, with honey bee and bumble bee amid red clover	B/Z 12345	B/Z 00001 to present	Surcharge supports Oregon State University programs studying how to maintain healthy pollinator populations.
	OSU (Oregon State University)	April 7, 2025 – present	A black and gray background with the logo of Oregon State University and "The Beaver State" in orange along the bottom.	B/V 12345	B/V 00001 to present	Supports OSU athletics and university strategic initiatives.
	Oregon Zoo	November 3, 2025 – present	White on multicolored background, with Asian elephant and roses.	O/Z 12345	O/Z 00001 to present	Surcharge supports the Oregon Zoo Foundation for conservation education, species recovery and animal wellbeing.

There are also special plates available for special interest vehicles, antique vehicles, veterans, and various service clubs.

== Non-passenger plates ==
Image	Type	Dates issued	Design	Serial format	Serials issued	Notes
	Amateur Radio Operator			Serial begins with 'A', 'K', 'W' or 'N'	Reflects call letters issued to amateur radio operators by the FCC	These plates can be issued on the optional Salmon, Crater Lake and Cultural Trust designs. They were also issued on the Oregon Trail design.
	Amateur Radio Operator – Motorcycle/Moped			Serial begins with 'A', 'K', 'W' or 'N'	Reflects call letters issued to amateur radio operators by the FCC	
	Apportioned Truck	1975–present	Blue on gold; "APPORTIONED" at bottom	Y123456	Y000001 to present	Issued to trucks based in Oregon that operate interstate and have a GVW of 26,000 pounds or less. Trucks are not subject to Oregon's weight mile tax.
	Apportioned Truck		White on red or black on white with "APPORTIONED" at bottom and "DOT" or "PUC" at upper right corner	YABC123	YAAA001 to present	Issued to trucks based in Oregon that operate interstate and have a GVW of more than 26,000 pounds. Trucks are subject to Oregon's weight mile tax.
	Apportioned Trailer	1975 to ?	Blue on gold; "APPORTIONED" at bottom	Z123456	Z000001 to present	Issued to trailers based in Oregon that operate interstate. May have been discontinued in favor of the Heavy Permanent license plate.
	Bus		Orange on aluminum; "OREGON" at top	B 123; B 1-234		Issued to buses designed and used for carrying passengers, baggage and express for compensation. Also any vehicle with a registration weight of more than 10,000 pounds (e.g. church bus, private school bus, worker bus, etc.) that is primarily used for carrying passengers. Also bus trailer.
	Bus		Blue on gold; "OREGON" at top	B 1-234; B 1234; B 12345; B012345		Issued to buses designed and used for carrying passengers, baggage and express for compensation. Also any vehicle with a registration weight of more than 10,000 pounds (e.g. church bus, private school bus, worker bus, etc.) that is primarily used for carrying passengers. Also bus trailer.
	Camper	before 1973	White on black; "CAMPER" at bottom	K123456	K700001 to approx. K760000	Issued to “camper” which is a structure with a floor designed to be mounted upon a motor vehicle but not permanently attached.
	Camper	1973 to ?	Blue on gold; "CAMPER" at bottom	K123456	K760001 to approx. K790000	Issued to “camper” which is a structure with a floor designed to be mounted upon a motor vehicle but not permanently attached.
	Camper		Blue on gold; sticker box at top and "Oregon" at bottom	K123456	K790001 to approx. K810000	Issued to “camper” which is a structure with a floor designed to be mounted upon a motor vehicle but not permanently attached.
	Camper	1993–99	Oregon Trail base	K123456	Approx. K990000 to K999999	Issued to “camper” which is a structure with a floor designed to be mounted upon a motor vehicle but not permanently attached.
	Camper	? to present	Blue on gold; "OREGON" at top	K123456	K810001 to present	Issued to “camper” which is a structure with a floor designed to be mounted upon a motor vehicle but not permanently attached.
	Charitable/Non-Profit	1989–early 2000s	Blue on gold; "OREGON" at top with sticker box at bottom	C/N 12345	C/N 00001 to approx. C/N 02400	Issued to trucks or buses owned and used by charitable or nonprofit organizations.
	Charitable/Non-Profit	early 2000s–mid 2000s	Blue on gold; "OREGON" at top	C/N 12345	C/N 02401 to approx. C/N 03200	Issued to trucks or buses owned and used by charitable or nonprofit organizations.
	Charitable/Non-Profit	mid. 2000s–present	Blue on gold; "OREGON" at top with sticker box at bottom	C/N 12345	C/N 03200 to C/N 04617 (as of August 23, 2021)	Issued to trucks or buses owned and used by charitable or nonprofit organizations.
	Coach					
	Commercial Truck	1966–73	Orange on aluminum	T123456	T200001 to approx. T346500	Issued to trucks that only operate within Oregon and have a GVW of 26,000 pounds or less.
	Commercial Truck	1974–present	Blue on gold	T123456	Approx. T346501 to present	Issued to trucks that only operate within Oregon and have a GVW of 26,000 pounds or less.
	Commercial Truck		White on red or black on white with "COMMERCIAL" at bottom and "DOT" or "PUC" at upper right corner	YCBC123	YCAA001 to present	Issued to trucks that only operate within Oregon and have a GVW of more than 26,000 pounds.
	Dealer	1977-1983	Blue on gold with "OREGON DEALER" and 2-digit year or validation sticker at bottom	D/A 1234 A		Issued to dealers with current business license
	Dealer	1984-early 2000s	Blue on gold with "OREGON" at bottom; 1984 issues included "84" at bottom, other years used validation stickers	D/A 1234 A D/A 1234AB; D/A 1234 A/B		Issued to dealers with current business license
	Dealer	early 2000s-late 2000s	Blue on gold with "OREGON" at top	D/A 1234 A D/A 1234AB		Issued to dealers with current business license
	Dealer	late 2000s-present	Blue on gold or black on silver with "OREGON" at top and "DEALER" at bottom	D/A 1234 A D/A 1234AB; D/L 1234 A D/L 1234AB		Issued to dealers with current business license
	Dealer – Motorcycle/Moped/ Snowmobile/ATV		Blue on gold or black on silver			Issued to dealers with current business license.
	Disabled Person					
	Disabled Veteran	1973 – early 1990s	Blue on gold; "PERMANENT" at top, "VETERAN" at right and wheelchair under 'D' prefix	D12345	D00001 to approximately D06000	Serials continue on from those on the blue-on-gold plates, with D/1 99 99 followed by D/2 00 00, D/2 99 99 followed by D/3 00 00, etc.
	Disabled Veteran	1973 – early 1990s	As above, but with no wheelchair	D12345	D06001 to approximately D10000	Serials continue on from those on the blue-on-gold plates, with D/1 99 99 followed by D/2 00 00, D/2 99 99 followed by D/3 00 00, etc.
	Disabled Veteran	1973 – early 1990s	As above, but with "PERMANENT" at bottom	D12345	D10001 to approximately D18000	Serials continue on from those on the blue-on-gold plates, with D/1 99 99 followed by D/2 00 00, D/2 99 99 followed by D/3 00 00, etc.
	Disabled Veteran	early 1990s – present	1989 Douglas Fir graphic; "PERMANENT" at bottom and "VETERAN" at right	D/1 23 45	D/1 80 01 to present	Serials continue on from those on the blue-on-gold plates, with D/1 99 99 followed by D/2 00 00, D/2 99 99 followed by D/3 00 00, etc.
	Ex-POW					Issued to persons qualifying as former prisoners of war.
	Ex-POW – Motorcycle/Moped					Issued to persons qualifying as former prisoners of war.
	Farm Vehicle	before 1965	Various colors on aluminum with date stamped at top	F12-345	F10-000 and above	For use on motor vehicles used in farm operations.
	Farm Vehicle	1965–72	Orange on aluminum; sticker box at bottom	F12-345	F10-000 to approximately F71-500	For use on motor vehicles used in farm operations.
	Farm Vehicle	1973–present	Blue on gold; sticker box at bottom	F12-345	F71-501 to F99-999	For use on motor vehicles used in farm operations.
	Farm Vehicle	1973–present	Blue on gold; sticker box at bottom	F123456	F100000 to present	For use on motor vehicles used in farm operations.
	For-Rent		Blue on gold; "OREGON" at top and "DEC." and year of expiration at bottom	F/R 1-2345		Issued to trailers having a loaded weight of 8,000 lb or less that are for hire and are equipped with pneumatic tires. All plates expire on December 31 of the stated year.
	Government Exempt		Gold on blue; "PUBLICLY OWNED" at top and "OREGON" at bottom	E12-345; E123-456; E123456	E95-000 to approximately E122000	Issued to vehicles registered to state, local and regional agencies
	Government Exempt		Blue on gold; "PUBLICLY OWNED" at top and "OREGON" at bottom	E123456	E122001 to approximately E226000	Issued to vehicles registered to state, local and regional agencies
	Government Exempt		Blue on gold; "OREGON" at top and "PUBLICLY OWNED" at bottom	E123456	E226001 to present	Issued to vehicles registered to state, local and regional agencies
	Government Exempt – Motorcycle/Moped		Blue on gold; "OREGON" at top and "EXEMPT" at bottom	E/9 12345		
	Heavy Fixed Load			H/F 12345		Issued to vehicles, both motorized and non-motorized, that weigh over 3,000 lb. and are not designed to carry people or property.
	Heavy Trailer	1973 – late 1980s	Blue on gold; sticker box at bottom	H/T 12-345; H/T 12345	H/T 06–001 to approximately H/T 62000	Issued to trailers having a loaded weight over 8,000 lb.
	Heavy Trailer	late 1980s – present	Blue on gold; "PERMANENT" at bottom	H/B 12345	H/P 00001 to H/S 99999; H/U 00001 to H/V 74602 (as of April 6, 2022)	Issued to trailers having a loaded weight over 8,000 lb.
	Light Fixed Load		Blue on gold	L/F 12345		Issued to vehicles, both motorized and non-motorized, that weigh 3,000 lb. or less and are not designed to carry people or property. Examples of such vehicles are temporary lighting rigs and portable VMSes.
	Low-Speed Vehicle		Blue on gold; "OREGON" at top and sticker box at bottom	L/S 12345	L/S 00001 to ?	Issued to four-wheeled vehicles with a maximum speed of between 20 and 25 miles per hour.
	Low-Speed Vehicle		Blue on gold; "OREGON" at top	L/S 12345	? to L/S 00521 (as of September 23, 2016)	Issued to four-wheeled vehicles with a maximum speed of between 20 and 25 miles per hour.
	Medium-Speed Vehicle		Blue on gold; "OREGON" at top	M/S 12345	M/S 00001 to present	Issued to four-wheeled electrical vehicles that are equipped with a roll cage or a crushproof body design and have a maximum speed of 35 miles per hour.
	Moped	1980s – present	Blue on gold	M/P 12345	M/P 00001 to present	Issued to two- or three-wheeled cycles or bicycles equipped with an independent power source, with an engine size of up to 50 cubic centimeters and a maximum speed of up to 30 miles per hour.
	Motor Home		Blue on yellow	H123456	H900001 to approx. H913000	
	Motor Home		Blue on gold; "MOTOR HOME" at bottom	H123456	H913001 to approx. H952000	
	Motor Home		Blue on gold; sticker box at bottom	H123456	H952001 to H999999; H100001 to approx. H135000	
	Motor Home		Oregon Trail base	H123456	H800001 to approx. H809999	
	Motor Home		Oregon Trail base	H/C 12345	H/C 00001 to approx. 17999	
	Motor Home		Blue on gold; sticker box at bottom	H/C 12345	H/C 99999 to approx. H/C 58000 (issued in reverse)	
	Motor Home		Blue on gold	H/C 12345	H/C 57999 to 18000 (issued in reverse)	
	Motor Home		Blue on gold	H/D 12345	H/D 00001 to present	
	Motorcycle	1968–70	White on blue; sticker box at bottom	12345	1 to approximately 85000	White-on-blue and gold-on-blue plates are still valid and may be renewed. In the current serial format, M/2 99999 was followed by M/3 00000, M/3 99999 was followed by M/4 00000 and so on.
	Motorcycle	1968–70	White on blue; sticker box at bottom	M12345	M85001 to approximately M90000	White-on-blue and gold-on-blue plates are still valid and may be renewed. In the current serial format, M/2 99999 was followed by M/3 00000, M/3 99999 was followed by M/4 00000 and so on.
	Motorcycle	1970–72	Gold on blue; sticker box at bottom	M12345; M123456	M90001 to approximately M188000	White-on-blue and gold-on-blue plates are still valid and may be renewed. In the current serial format, M/2 99999 was followed by M/3 00000, M/3 99999 was followed by M/4 00000 and so on.
	Motorcycle	1973–75	Blue on gold; sticker box at bottom	M123456	M188001 to approximately M199999	White-on-blue and gold-on-blue plates are still valid and may be renewed. In the current serial format, M/2 99999 was followed by M/3 00000, M/3 99999 was followed by M/4 00000 and so on.
	Motorcycle	1973–75	Blue on gold; sticker box at bottom	M/1 23456	M/2 00000 to approximately M/2 55000	White-on-blue and gold-on-blue plates are still valid and may be renewed. In the current serial format, M/2 99999 was followed by M/3 00000, M/3 99999 was followed by M/4 00000 and so on.
	Motorcycle	1975–present	As above, but without sticker box	M/1 23456	M/2 55001 to present	White-on-blue and gold-on-blue plates are still valid and may be renewed. In the current serial format, M/2 99999 was followed by M/3 00000, M/3 99999 was followed by M/4 00000 and so on.
	National Guard			N/G12 345	N/G00 001 to present	Issued to current active members of the Oregon National Guard.
	Old Timer	1952–54	Black on aluminum; "OLD TIMER" at left	A-123	A-1 to approximately A-636	Issued to any vehicle that is older than half the number of years between 1900 and the current year (so, in 2021, any vehicle that dates from 1960 or before). Black-on-aluminum Old Timer plates were revalidated with tabs until 1955, while gold-on-blue versions were revalidated with tabs until 1960, then with stickers until 1964.
	Old Timer	1955–59	Gold on blue; "OLD TIMER" at left	A-123	A-1 to A-999	Issued to any vehicle that is older than half the number of years between 1900 and the current year (so, in 2021, any vehicle that dates from 1960 or before). Black-on-aluminum Old Timer plates were revalidated with tabs until 1955, while gold-on-blue versions were revalidated with tabs until 1960, then with stickers until 1964.
	Old Timer	1955–59	Gold on blue; "OLD TIMER" at left	1-234	1-000 to approximately 2-100	Issued to any vehicle that is older than half the number of years between 1900 and the current year (so, in 2021, any vehicle that dates from 1960 or before). Black-on-aluminum Old Timer plates were revalidated with tabs until 1955, while gold-on-blue versions were revalidated with tabs until 1960, then with stickers until 1964.
	Old Timer	1960–63	As above, but with "PACIFIC WONDERLAND" at bottom	1-234	2-101 to approximately 3-000	Issued to any vehicle that is older than half the number of years between 1900 and the current year (so, in 2021, any vehicle that dates from 1960 or before). Black-on-aluminum Old Timer plates were revalidated with tabs until 1955, while gold-on-blue versions were revalidated with tabs until 1960, then with stickers until 1964.
	Historic Vehicle	1964–72	Gold on blue; "HISTORIC VEHICLE" at left	1-234	3-001 to approximately 6-000	Issued to any vehicle that is older than half the number of years between 1900 and the current year (so, in 2021, any vehicle that dates from 1960 or before). Black-on-aluminum Old Timer plates were revalidated with tabs until 1955, while gold-on-blue versions were revalidated with tabs until 1960, then with stickers until 1964.
	Historic Vehicle	1973 – early 1980s	Blue on gold; "HISTORIC VEHICLE" at left	1-234	6-001 to approximately 8-500	Issued to any vehicle that is older than half the number of years between 1900 and the current year (so, in 2021, any vehicle that dates from 1960 or before). Black-on-aluminum Old Timer plates were revalidated with tabs until 1955, while gold-on-blue versions were revalidated with tabs until 1960, then with stickers until 1964.
	Historic Vehicle	early 1980s – late 1980s	Blue on gold; "HISTORIC VEHICLE" at left	1234	8501 to 9999	Issued to any vehicle that is older than half the number of years between 1900 and the current year (so, in 2021, any vehicle that dates from 1960 or before). Black-on-aluminum Old Timer plates were revalidated with tabs until 1955, while gold-on-blue versions were revalidated with tabs until 1960, then with stickers until 1964.
	Antique Vehicle	late 1980s – late 1990s	Blue on gold; "ANTIQUE VEHICLE" at top	A/Q 12345	A/Q 00001 to approximately A/Q 02000	Issued to any vehicle that is older than half the number of years between 1900 and the current year (so, in 2021, any vehicle that dates from 1960 or before). Black-on-aluminum Old Timer plates were revalidated with tabs until 1955, while gold-on-blue versions were revalidated with tabs until 1960, then with stickers until 1964.
	Antique Vehicle	late 1990s – present	As above, but with "ANTIQUE VEHICLE" at bottom	A/Q 12345	A/Q 02001 to present	Issued to any vehicle that is older than half the number of years between 1900 and the current year (so, in 2021, any vehicle that dates from 1960 or before). Black-on-aluminum Old Timer plates were revalidated with tabs until 1955, while gold-on-blue versions were revalidated with tabs until 1960, then with stickers until 1964.
	Permanent Fleet	c. 1973–2004	Blue on gold; "PERMANENT FLEET" at top and "OREGON" at bottom	P/F 12345	P/F 00001 to approximately P/F 27000	Issued to owners of fleets of 50 or more vehicles used within Oregon. Fleet vehicles can be passenger cars, trucks, buses or utility trailers.
	Permanent Fleet	c. 2004–present	Blue on gold; "OREGON" at top and "PERMANENT FLEET" at bottom	P/F 12345	P/F 27001 to P/F 44010 (as of July 4, 2021)	Issued to owners of fleets of 50 or more vehicles used within Oregon. Fleet vehicles can be passenger cars, trucks, buses or utility trailers.
	School Bus		Blue on gold; "SCHOOL BUS" at top, "OREGON" at bottom and "PERM" at right	S/C 12345	S/C 00001 to present	
	School Bus		Blue on gold, "OREGON" at top, "SCHOOL BUS" at bottom and "PERM" at right	S/C 12345	S/C 00001 to present	
	Special Interest	before c. 2004	Blue on gold; "OREGON" at bottom	S/P 12345	S/P 00001 to approximately S/P 10000	Issued on vehicles that are maintained as collector's items and are at least 25 years old.
	Special Interest	c. 2004–present	Blue on gold; "OREGON" at top	S/P 12345	S/P 10001 to S/P 33754 (as of December 25, 2021)	Issued on vehicles that are maintained as collector's items and are at least 25 years old.
	Special Use Trailer			S/T 12345	S/T 00001 to present	
	Tow Truck		Blue on gold; "OREGON" at top	T/W 12345	T/W 00001 to present	Issued to individuals who tow vehicles not owned by them in tow and recovery operations for direct or indirect compensation. Also issued to businesses which must transport damaged, disabled or abandoned vehicles.
	Transporter			TR 123; TR 123A; TR 123AB; T/R 123ABC; T/N 12345		
	Travel Trailer	c. 1964–73	White on pistachio green; "ORE" and sticker box at top and "TRAVEL TRAILER" at bottom	R123456	R400001 to approximately R499500	
	Travel Trailer	c. 1973–83	Blue on gold; "ORE" and sticker box at top and "TRAVEL TRAILER" at bottom	R123456	R499501 to approximately R575000	
	Travel Trailer	c. 1983–2004	Blue on gold; sticker box at top and "OREGON" at bottom	R123456	R575001 to approximately R750000	
	Travel Trailer	1993–99	Oregon Trail base	R123456	R980001 to R999999	
	Travel Trailer	c. 2004–2022	Blue on gold; "OREGON" at top	R123456	R750001 to R979999	
	Travel Trailer	2022–present	Blue on gold; "OREGON" at top	R12345A	R00001A to present	
	Utility Trailer	c. 1979–83	Blue on gold; "ORE" and sticker box at top and "TRAILER" at bottom	U123456	U000001 to approximately U041000	Issued to trailers having a loaded weight of 8,000 lb or less.
	Utility Trailer	c. 1983–88	Blue on gold; sticker box at top and "OREGON" at bottom	U123456	U041001 to approximately U110000	Issued to trailers having a loaded weight of 8,000 lb or less.
	Utility Trailer	c. 1988–89	1988 Douglas Fir graphic	U123456	U110001 to approximately U140000	Issued to trailers having a loaded weight of 8,000 lb or less.
	Utility Trailer	c. 1989–present	1989 Douglas Fir graphic	U123456	U140001 to present	Issued to trailers having a loaded weight of 8,000 lb or less.
