= Automobile License Plate Collectors Association =

Organization of license plate collectors

Automobile License Plate Collectors Association, Inc. (ALPCA)
- Type: Membership-driven
- Industry: History, Research
- Founded: December 22, 1954; 71 years ago in Rumney Depot, New Hampshire, U.S., incorporated December 1957
- Founders: Dr. Cecil George, Asa P. Colby
- Headquarters: United States of America
- Area served: Worldwide
- Key people: Cyndi McCabe (President and Chairman of the Board)
- Products: Memberships, magazine, archives, conventions, annual Best Plate Award
- Revenue: 242,446 United States dollar (2022)
- Total assets: 493,458 United States dollar (2022)
- Website: Official website

The Automobile License Plate Collectors Association (ALPCA) is the largest such organization in the world. Founded in Rumney Depot, New Hampshire, United States, in 1954 and holding its first meeting/convention in North Attleborough, Massachusetts, in 1955. It serves as a way for license plate collectors to trade plates, distribute news, and provide historic information to members.

== Overview ==
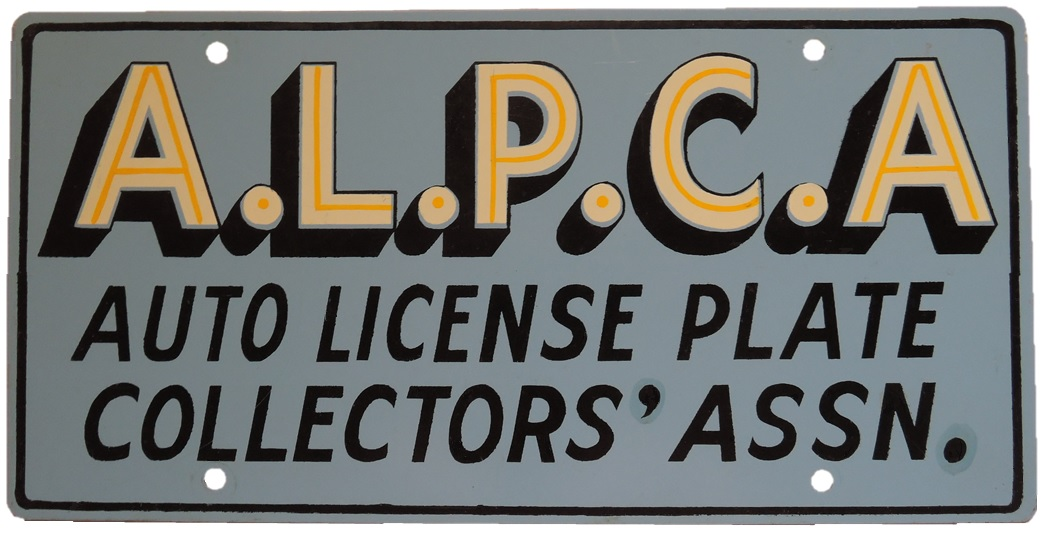
ALPCA Souvenir license plate

ALPCA currently has approximately 3,900 registered members and over 15,000 registered member numbers, although many of the earlier—and therefore lower-numbered—members are now deceased or are no longer members. When an individual joins, he or she is assigned a membership number, which started with #1 in 1954, and are currently being issued in the 15000s. Members treasure their "ALPCA number" and often are known as much by the time period in which they joined as by name or geographic home. The club hosts an annual convention each June or July that attracts several hundred members, and regional meets take place in a number of states, provinces, and countries throughout the year. Due to the COVID-19 pandemic the 2020 convention, originally scheduled for Tulsa, Oklahoma from July 8–11, 2020, was cancelled. The next convention, open to members only, was scheduled for Covington, Kentucky, from August 4 to 7, 2021.

Members come from all 50 U.S. states and the District of Columbia, as well as nineteen countries. Most members reside in the United States, followed by Canada, Germany, and Australia. Members receive the bi-monthly full-color publication "Plates"; have full access to the organization's web-based license plate archives for every country around the world, as well as back issues of all publications; and can attend both regional meets and the annual convention.

Despite the club's name, many members also collect and exchange license plates from vehicles other than automobiles. Antique vehicle, bus, camper, farm, military, motorcycle, trailer, and truck plates are just a few of the hundreds of other plate types that have been issued and are now collected by members.

Since 1972 ALPCA has annually presented a "Best Plate Award" to an American state or Canadian province. To better educate the public regarding genuine license plates, the association provides a "Guide to Deceptive and Misleading Plates" for free on its website.

Many ALPCA members maintain their own interests and websites, sometimes overlapping, and sometimes going way beyond the confines of license plate collecting. A subset of them are "Extra Miler Club" members, who seek to visit every county (or county equivalent) in the United States, often while picking antique shops and other venues for old plates. One member keeps track of the "highest numbers" issued in each state, and his website records what combinations are the latest to be issued.

ALPCA members often consult the media for stories on issues in automobilia.

== Membership ==
ALPCA has approximately 3,900 current members. Members choose whether their membership lasts one, two, three, four, or five years. Junior memberships, for those below 18 years of age, are also available. The organization's magazine, "Plates," is mailed to all members, and all members in good standing are entitled to vote for officers and the Best Plate Award. Members can research plates using the association's online archives, which have been extensively expanded and updated in recent years. Members may also display the ALPCA logo (shield) for personal use.

== Executive Board ==
ALPCA is run by a seven-member Executive Board composed of the President, Vice-President, and five Directors. All members serve two-year terms. The President and three of the Directors' terms expire in even-numbered years, while the Vice-President and two Directors' terms expire in odd-numbered years. The Administrative Staff, composed of the Secretary, Treasurer, Plates Editor, Webmaster, Regional Meet Coordinator, Complaint Chairman, and Legal Counsel, are appointed by the Executive Board. Similarly, the Project Staff, consisting of the Convention Planner, Convention Administrator, Archivist, Hall of Fame Coordinator, and Best Plate Coordinator, are also appointed by the Executive Board. The President also serves as the Chairman of the Executive Board. Note that prior to the 1977 election of board members, there were multiple other elected offices which are not shown here.

Executive Board Members
| Position | Name | Location | Term Ending |
|---|---|---|---|
| President | Cyndi McCabe | Elyria, OH | July 8, 2026 |
| Vice-President | Dick Yourga | Amherst, MA | July 8, 2025 |
| Director | John Northup | Logan, UT | July 8, 2026 |
| Director | Bill Dickerson | Manchester, NH | July 8, 2025 |
| Director | Joel Kimmet | Cincinnati, OH | July 8, 2025 |
| Director | Mike Morgan | Esterno, FL | July 8, 2026 |
| Director | Stephen Tuday | Woodstock, GA | July 8, 2026 |

=== List of ALPCA Presidents ===
The ALPCA presidents' term of office has changed two times. From 1955 until 1961 their term was two years, from 1961 until 2004 the term was one year, and since 2004 the term is once again two years. To simplify the following chart, multiple terms served consecutively are combined in one row. The following list of ALPCA Presidents was compiled from the ALPCA Newsletter, ALPCA Register, and Plates Magazine.

List of ALPCA Presidents
| No. | Name | Dates | Terms | Notes |
|---|---|---|---|---|
| 1 | Dr. Cecil W. George | 1955–1957 | 1 | Member #1; Granted life membership in 1988 |
| 2 | Ralph Perkins | 1957 – July 4, 1958 | 1 | Resigned |
| 3 | Frank Spinney | July 5, 1958 – 1959 | 1 | Appointed |
| 4 | Roy A. Carson | 1959–1961 | 1 | |
| 5 | Asa P. Colby | 1961–1962 | 1 | |
| 6 | Clarence Titus | 1962–1963 | 1 | |
| 7 | Carl Sweiven | 1963–1964 | 1 | |
| 8 | Harvey Parkes | 1964–1966 | 2 | |
| 9 | Andrew Young | 1966–1967 | 1 | |
| 10 | Ernie Wilson | 1967–1968 | 1 | |
| 11 | Joe Oliver | 1968–1969 | 1 | |
| 12 | Frank German | 1969–1972 | 3 | |
| 13 | Paul M. Maginnity | 1972–1973 | 1 | |
| 14 | Willie Stahl | 1973–1974 | 1 | |
| 15 | Earl Jenson | 1974–1975 | 1 | |
| 16 | Edward Dietz | 1975–1976 | 1 | |
| 17 | Dick Pack | 1976–1977 | 1 | |
| 18 | Arthur D. Currie | 1977–1979 | 2 | |
| 19 | James A. Crilly | 1979–1981 | 2 | |
| 20 | Robert M. Crisler | 1981–1983 | 2 | |
| 21 | James K. Fox | 1983–1985 | 2 | |
| 22 | Robert M. Crisler | 1985–1987 | 2 | |
| 23 | Jeffrey C. Minard | 1987–1989 | 2 | |
| 24 | James A. Crilly | 1989–1991 | 2 | |
| 25 | Michael C. Wiener | 1991–1993 | 2 | |
| 26 | James K. Fox | 1993–1995 | 2 | |
| 27 | Dale W. Blewett | 1995–1997 | 2 | |
| 28 | Richard Yourga | 1997–2000 | 3 | |
| 29 | Barney Schukraft | 2000–2001 | 1 | |
| 30 | Michael R. Naughton | 2001–2006 | 4 | Three single-year terms and one two-year term. |
| 31 | Jeff Francis | 2006–2010 | 2 | |
| 32 | Michael Liscio | 2010 – May 30, 2011 | 1 | Resigned |
| 33 | Stephen Tuday | June 1, 2011 – July 2011 | 1 | Resigned |
| 34 | Greg Gibson | July 2011 – 2016 | 3 | |
| 35 | Cyndi McCabe | 2016 – | 5 | |

== Events ==
=== International conventions ===
ALPCA has held annual conventions since 1955. The four earliest conventions were held at the host members' homes. Since 1959 the annual conventions have been held in a larger private or public venue, and those held since 1984 have been at a convention center or other similarly large public venue. Conventions include three days of selling and trading of plates on the convention floor, an auction of license plates donated by members and individual state departments of motor vehicles, member displays that are judged and presented awards in many categories, committee and membership meetings, and social activities. Newly elected Executive Board members are installed just prior to the convention start. Conventions are open only to members and their guests.

List of ALPCA International Conventions
| No. | Year | Venue | Location |
|---|---|---|---|
| 1 | 1955 | Property of Cecil George | North Attleborough, MA |
| 2 | 1956 | Property of Cecil George | North Attleborough, MA |
| 3 | 1957 | Property of Robert Oliver | Setauket, NY |
| 4 | 1958 | Property of Frank Spinney | Bristol, NH |
| 5 | 1959 | Yorklyn Gun Club | Yorklyn, DE |
| 6 | 1960 | Odd Fellows Hall | Adamsburg, PA |
| 7 | 1961 | Giroux Motor Company | Phillipsburg, NJ |
| 8 | 1962 | American Legion Hall | North East, MD |
| 9 | 1963 | American Legion Hall | Canastota, NY |
| 10 | 1964 | Grange Hall, Hancock County Fair Grounds | Findlay, OH |
| 11 | 1965 | Natural Bridge Hotel | Natural Bridge, VA |
| 12 | 1966 | Campus Center, Otterbein College | Westerville, OH |
| 13 | 1967 | Franklin County Fair Grounds | Greenfield, MA |
| 14 | 1968 | Merchants Building, Hancock County Fair Grounds | Findlay, OH |
| 15 | 1969 | Memorial Gymnasium, Juniata College | Huntingdon, PA |
| 16 | 1970 | Kane County Fairgrounds | St. Charles, IL |
| 17 | 1971 | Youth Center, Ohio State Fairgrounds | Columbus, OH |
| 18 | 1972 | Utah National Guard Armory | Salt Lake City, UT |
| 19 | 1973 | Lakeside Gardens, Britannia Park | Ottawa, ONT, CAN |
| 20 | 1974 | Hoover Community Building, Garfield Fair Grounds | Enid, OK |
| 21 | 1975 | Acadia Community Hall | Calgary, ALB, CAN |
| 22 | 1976 | Juniata College | Huntingdon, PA |
| 23 | 1977 | Salem Community High School | Salem, IL |
| 24 | 1978 | Lehigh Resort Motel | Lehigh Acres, FL |
| 25 | 1979 | Lakeland Community College | Mentor, OH |
| 26 | 1980 | Oklahoma State Fairgounds | Oklahoma City, OK |
| 27 | 1981 | Central Cabarrus High School | Concord, NC |
| 28 | 1982 | Lake Michigan College | Benton Harbor, MI |
| 29 | 1983 | Dulaney Senior High School | Timonium, MD |
| 30 | 1984 | Rushmore Plaza Civic Center | Rapid City, SD |
| 31 | 1985 | Asheville Civic Center | Ashville, NC |
| 32 | 1986 | Springfield Convention Center | Springfield, IL |
| 33 | 1987 | Abuquerque Convention Center | Albuquerque, NM |
| 34 | 1988 | Arthur Ashe Center | Richmond, VA |
| 35 | 1989 | Riverside Convention Center | Rochester, NY |
| 36 | 1990 | Rapid City Convention Center | Rapid City, SD |
| 37 | 1991 | Kansas City Market Center | Kansas City, MO |
| 38 | 1992 | Peoria Civic Center | Peoria, IL |
| 39 | 1993 | Hammons Trade Center, Aurora | Denver, CO |
| 40 | 1994 | Chattanooga/Hamilton County Conv. & Trade Ctr. | Chattanooga, TN |
| 41 | 1995 | SeaGate Convention Centre | Toledo, OH |
| 42 | 1996 | Peoria Civic Center | Peoria, IL |
| 43 | 1997 | Tucson Convention Center | Tucson, AZ |
| 44 | 1998 | Niagara Falls Convention and Civic Center | Niagara Falls, NY |
| 45 | 1999 | Chattanooga/Hamilton County Conv. & Trade Ctr. | Chattanooga, TN |
| 46 | 2000 | Hammons Trade Center, Aurora | Denver, CO |
| 47 | 2001 | Peoria Civic Center | Peoria, IL |
| 48 | 2002 | Niagara Falls Convention and Civic Center | Niagara Falls, NY |
| 49 | 2003 | Tucson Convention Center | Tucson, AZ |
| 50 | 2004 | Rhode Island Convention Center | Providence, RI |
| 51 | 2005 | Sioux Falls Convention Center | Sioux Falls, SD |
| 52 | 2006 | Ontario Convention Center | Ontario, CA |
| 53 | 2007 | Von Braun Center | Huntsville, AL |
| 54 | 2008 | Salt Palace Convention Center | Salt Lake City, UT |
| 55 | 2009 | Bayfront Convention Center | Erie, PA |
| 56 | 2010 | Arlington Convention Center | Arlington, TX |
| 57 | 2011 | Charleston Convention Center | Charleston, WV |
| 58 | 2012 | Iowa Events Center | Des Moines, IA |
| 59 | 2013 | Grand Sierra Resort | Reno, NV |
| 60 | 2014 | Rochester Riverside Convention Center | Rochester, NY |
| 61 | 2015 | Northwest Arkansas Embassy Suites | Rogers, AR |
| 62 | 2016 | Grand Wayne Convention Center | Fort Wayne, IN |
| 63 | 2017 | Ontario Convention Center | Ontario, CA |
| 64 | 2018 | Valley Forge Casino Resort | Valley Forge, PA |
| 65 | 2019 | Knoxville Convention Center | Knoxville, TN |
| ---- | 2020 | Cox Business Center | Tulsa, OK (cancelled due to COVID-19 pandemic) |
| 66 | 2021 | Northern Kentucky Convention Center | Covington, KY |
| 67 | 2022 | Hampton Roads Convention Center | Hampton, VA |
| 68 | 2023 | Crowne Plaza Denver Airport Convention Center | Denver, CO |
| 69 | 2024 | Lansing Convention Center | Lansing, MI |
| 70 | 2025 | Cox Business Center | Tulsa, OK |
| 71 | 2026 | Grand Wayne Convention Center | Fort Wayne, Indiana |
| 72 | 2027 | River's Edge Convention Center | St. Cloud, Minnesota |
| 73 | 2028 | Von Braun Center | Huntsville, Alabama |

=== Regional meets ===
Regional meets provide the opportunity for members to sell, trade, or barter plates with other members between annual conventions. The dates for officially sanctioned meets are published in the organization's magazine "Plates." These meets often include auctions, regional meetings, awards, and a social event such as a lunch meal. Like the annual conventions, regional meets are open only to members and invited guests. The number of regional meets varies each year, but recent years have seen 15 – 25 regional meetings. Some regional groups hold a single meeting, while others may host quarterly meetings. A list of upcoming regional meetings is maintained at the ALPCA website.

=== Independent meets ===
Although these meets are not sponsored by ALPCA, they provide some of the same collecting opportunities that the ALPCA annual convention and officially sanctioned regional meets provide. The independent meets also allow the general public a way to meet ALPCA members, help members learn about plates by talking to sellers, and begin or add to their collections of license plates. A list of upcoming independent meetings is maintained at the ALPCA website.

== Publications ==
From its inception, ALPCA has distributed a publication to all active members. Unofficially, the primary publication was titled the ALPCA Newsletter, but it was many years before this was formalized. The name first appeared on the masthead in April 1972, but the name had appeared in the newsletter itself many times before this date. The ALPCA Newsletter changed names in February 2000 to the ALPCA Register, and since December 2004 has been known as Plates Magazine or informally as Plates. Back issues of these publications are available to active members on the association's website.

=== Plates Magazine ===
Plates Magazine is full color and regularly features articles relating the history of a topic, such as an individual state, province, or country's plates. It also provides information about newly issued plates; convention, regional, and independent meet details; photo histories of plates and related ephemera, such as validation stickers or tabs; topical histories such as motorcycle, special event, ham radio, and personalized plates; articles on individual collectors or collections; and annual base plate information for North American jurisdictions.

=== Archives ===
The online archives provide members an extensive research tool for information regarding the year a license plate was issued, serial numbers issued, colors, dates issued, slogans, plate material, and other plate characteristics. Originally relatively static, the archives have been greatly expanded, have become an online database that is much easier to search, and provide much improved photos over the original archives.

=== Book ===
For the 50th anniversary of ALPCA, two members wrote a book detailing the association's history. This publication, "A Moving History, 50 Years Of ALPCA, 100 Years of License Plates" was written by Jeff Minard & Tim Stentiford, and published by Turner Communications. In addition to ALPCA's history, the book details 100 years of license plate history, and over 275 profiles of a cross section of ALPCA members.

== Best Plate Award ==
Since 1972 members have voted each year to name one United States or Canadian license plate design, and in some years two such designs, introduced during the previous year as the "Best Plate." The first award went to Pennsylvania for their early Bicentennial plate which featured the Liberty Bell in the center. The award to the 1970 Northwest Territories for their polar bear-shaped license plate was made by Executive Board action between December 1973 and February 1974.

Members' votes are based on both the plate's legibility and its aesthetics. For 1995, 1997, and 1998, the club recognized one standard-issue plate and one optional-issue plate, while in 1985 and 1989, two jurisdictions' designs tied for first place. The presentation of the award each year is usually covered by media outlets in the state that wins the award. For the 2015 award, Alaska declined a presentation ceremony due to issues over the use of a copyrighted image (the standing bear) without permission from the artist. For 2019 Oregon requested there be no ceremony due to the Covid pandemic.

ALPCA Best Plate Award Winners
| Image | Year | Jurisdiction | Times won | Design | Type |
|---|---|---|---|---|---|
| | 1970 | Northwest Territories | 1 | Centennial | general |
| | 1971 | Pennsylvania | 1 | Bicentennial State | general |
| | 1972 | Wyoming | 1 | Bucking Bronco | general |
| | 1973 | Prince Edward Island | 1 | The Place To Be ... In 73 | general |
| | 1974 | South Dakota | 1 | Mount Rushmore | general |
| | 1975 | Colorado | 1 | Centennial | general |
| | 1976 | Michigan | 1 | Bicentennial | general |
| | 1977 | Mississippi | 1 | The Hospitality State | general |
| | 1978 | Wyoming | 2 | Wooden Fence | general |
| | 1979 | Indiana | 1 | 1779 George Rogers Clark | general |
| | 1980 | Kansas | 1 | Wheat | general |
| | 1981 | South Dakota | 2 | Mount Rushmore | general |
| | 1982 | North Carolina | 1 | First in Flight | general |
| | 1983 | California | 1 | The Golden State | optional |
| | 1984 | Maryland | 1 | 350th Anniversary | optional |
| | 1985 | Nevada | 1 | Bighorn Sheep | general |
| | 1985 | North Dakota | 1 | Theodore Roosevelt | general |
| | 1986 | Utah | 1 | Greatest Snow on Earth | general |
| | 1987 | Idaho | 1 | Centennial | optional |
| | 1988 | Oregon | 1 | Fir tree | general |
| | 1989 | Nova Scotia | 1 | Canada's Ocean Playground | general |
| | 1989 | Oklahoma | 1 | Osage Battle Shield | general |
| | 1990 | South Carolina | 1 | Wren | general |
| | 1991 | Idaho | 2 | Famous Potatoes | general |
| | 1992 | Mississippi | 2 | Blue Gradient | general |
| | 1993 | North Dakota | 2 | Discover the Spirit | general |
| | 1994 | Kansas | 2 | Wheat | general |
| | 1995 | Texas | 1 | 150 Years of Statehood | general |
| | 1995 | Pennsylvania | 2 | Flagship Niagara | optional |
| | 1996 | Arizona | 1 | Grand Canyon State | general |
| | 1997 | Manitoba | 1 | Friendly | general |
| | 1997 | Wisconsin | 1 | Sesquicentennial | optional |
| | 1998 | Alaska | 1 | Gold Rush Centennial | general |
| | 1998 | Idaho | 3 | Wildlife—elk | optional |
| | 1999 | Virginia | 1 | George Washington Bicentennial | optional |
| | 2000 | Wyoming | 3 | Devils Tower | general |
| | 2001 | Arkansas | 1 | Game and Fish — Hummingbird | optional |
| | 2002 | Oregon | 2 | Crater Lake Centennial | optional |
| | 2003 | Kentucky | 1 | It's That Friendly | general |
| | 2004 | Oklahoma | 2 | State Parks — Pavilion | optional |
| | 2005 | Kansas | 3 | Home on the Range | optional |
| | 2006 | South Dakota | 3 | Great Faces. Great Places. | general |
| | 2007 | Mississippi | 3 | Biloxi Light | general |
| | 2008 | Delaware | 1 | Centennial Plate 1909–2009 | optional |
| | 2009 | Oklahoma | 3 | Sacred Rain Arrow | general |
| | 2010 | New Mexico | 1 | Centennial 1912–2012 | general |
| | 2011 | Arizona | 2 | 1912 Centennial 2012 | optional |
| | 2012 | Nebraska | 1 | Union Pacific Railroad Museum | optional |
| | 2013 | Michigan | 2 | The Mackinac Bridge | optional |
| | 2014 | Alberta | 1 | Support Our Troops | optional |
| | 2015 | Alaska | 2 | Grizzly bear | general |
| | 2016 | Arizona | 3 | Historic Route 66 | optional |
| | 2017 | New Mexico | 2 | Chile Capital of the World | general |
| | 2018 | Maryland | 2 | Protect The Chesapeake | optional |
| | 2019 | Oregon | 3 | Smokey Bear | optional |
| | 2020 | Oklahoma | 4 | Save the Monarchs | optional |
| | 2021 | Delaware | 2 | Support Pollinators | optional |
| | 2022 | Hawaii | 1 | Polynesian Voyaging Society | optional |
| | 2023 | New York | 1 | Long Island | optional |
| | 2024 | Rhode Island | 1 | Rose Island Lighthouse | optional |

== Hall of Fame ==
The ALPCA Hall of Fame was approved by the Board of Directors in 2002, but it did not officially induct any members until 2004. "The goal of the Hall of Fame is [to] provide a vehicle to learn about our founding fathers and the legacy of leaders throughout the years who have embodied the fraternal spirit of our hobby."

"To be considered for the Hall of Fame, candidates must have served the club or hobby unselfishly for the good of all without concern for praise, compensation, or reward; promoted membership; provided guidance to fellow members; and taught others the value of collecting." Any member in good standing may nominate any ALPCA member for induction into the Hall that they feel is deserving of the honor. The Hall of Fame Committee reviews all initial nominations, and the past presidents of the association vote to determine who on the list will be inducted into the Hall of Fame.

Hall of Fame Members:

- 2004
  - Roy Carson
  - Asa Colby
  - Cecil George
- 2005
  - Conrad Hughson
  - Gary Brent Kincade
  - Don Merrill
- 2006
  - James A. Crilly
  - Dr. Roy Kotz, Jr.
  - Paul Maginnity
- 2007
  - Rich Dragon
  - Jeff Minard
  - G. B. Moore
- 2008
  - Bob Crisler
- 2009
  - Earl Jenson
  - Robert Ward
  - Verdon Rustine
- 2010
  - James Fox
  - Keith Marvin
  - Richard Yourga
- 2011
  - Roger Haynes
  - Stephen Raiche
- 2012
  - Ned Flynn
  - Jim Finley
- 2013
  - Corb Moister
  - George Sammeth
  - Rick Schofield
- 2014
  - Chuck Sakryd
  - Ted Cline
  - Marty Mozille
- 2015
  - Mike Naughton
  - Dick Pack
- 2016
  - Eric Tanner
- 2017
  - Tom Boyd
  - Leo Good
  - Dave Kuehn
- 2018
  - John Boal
- 2019
  - Neil Parker
  - Jeff Francis
- 2020
  - Roy Rich
  - Jim Graves
- 2021
  - Gene Hauman
  - Greg Gibson
- 2022
  - Norm Radcliffe
- 2023
  - Scott Mitchell
  - Clark Wothe
- 2024
  - Dale Blewett
  - Dave Steckley
- 2025
  - Geoff Knox
  - Bill Dickerson

== Notable members ==
- Robert M. "Bob" Crisler, of Lafayette, Louisiana, served as an officer of ALPCA and was inducted as one of the first members of its Hall of Fame. He is a retired geography professor from the University of Louisiana, and authored "License Plate Values," the first collector price guide in the hobby.
- Jim Fox, drummer of the James Gang, served as an officer of ALPCA and authored one of the most prominent published works within the hobby, License Plates of the United States.
- Ernest R. Hemmings, of Quincy, Illinois, the founder of Hemmings Motor News.
- Keith Marvin, of Menands, New York, wrote three books about license plates and seven books total. He wrote over 3,000 articles on automotive history, and his work appeared in more than 70 different publications.
- Doug DeMuro, a YouTuber, automotive journalist, and businessman whose collection of low-numbered plates, including many political plates, serves as a backdrop for videos filmed in his garage.
- Augustus C. "Gus" Oliver, of Tulsa, Oklahoma, served as an officer of ALPCA, as the Best Plate Award Coordinator, authored the "License Plate Value Guide" in 2016 to continue the work that Bob Crisler and his son, Chuck Crisler, had begun, and authored "Oklahoma License Plate History" as well as several articles for Plates Magazine.

== See also ==
- License plate collecting
