= Can collecting =

Collecting hobby

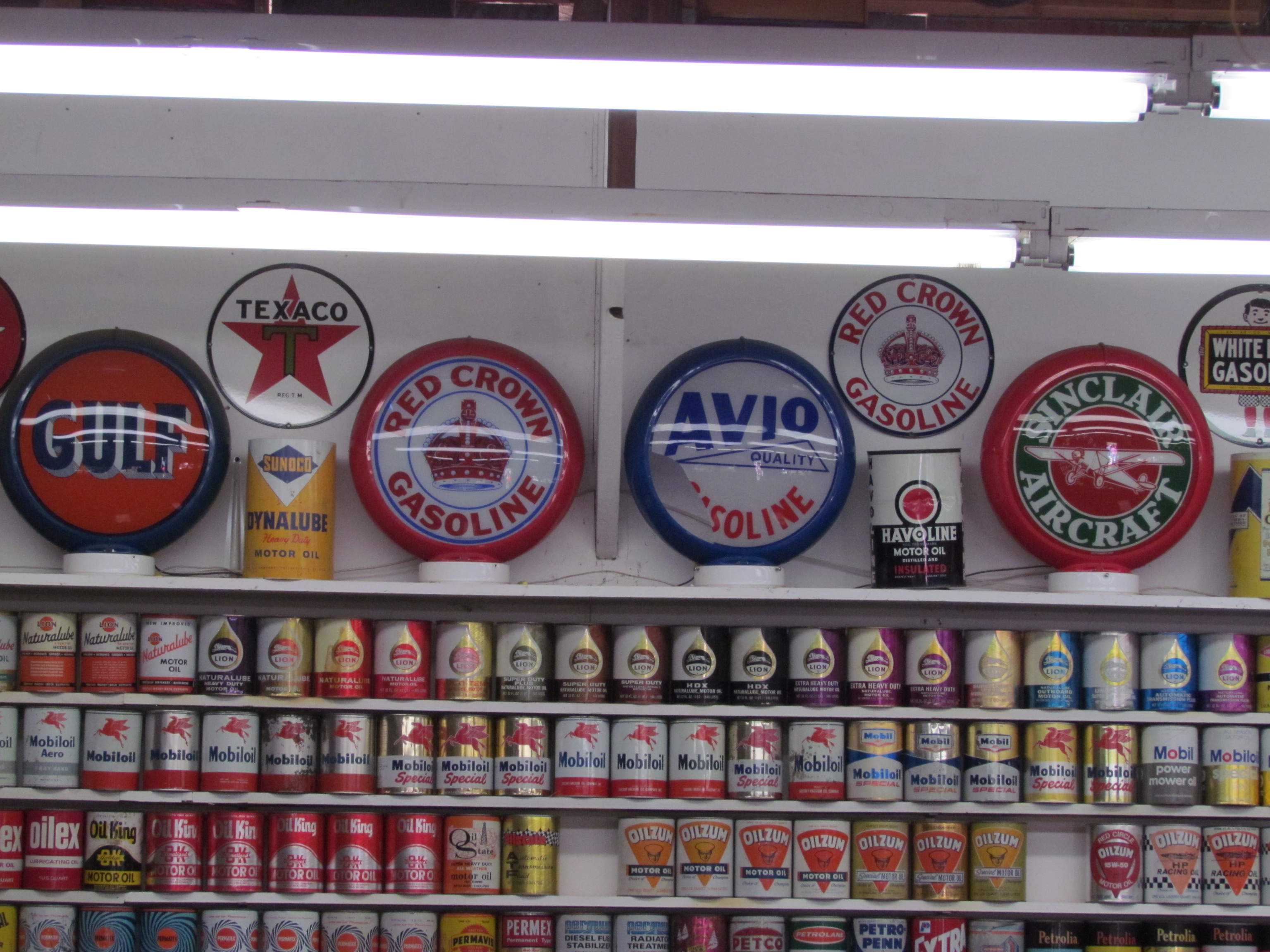
Oil cans collection in Stoke Ranch, California

Can collecting is the hobby of collecting cans, both aluminum and tin plate cans. There are many types of cans that can be collected from around the world, each with many different brands as well as brand variations and themes. Among the most popular cans to collect are soda ones, beer ones, and car oil ones, the latter of which are sometimes branded with well-known petrol company names. Other cans that may be considered as collectibles are milk cans coffee cans, syrup, salted peanuts, crayon and advertisement-oriented lithograph tins.

Sometimes, supermarkets and petrol companies have used cans as ways to advertise; these types of cans are also sought after by can collectors.

Can collecting can be exclusive to only one type of can: for example, collectors may dedicate themselves to collecting beer, soda, food or oil cans only. But collectors may also dedicate themselves to collecting cans from all types.

== History ==
While it is difficult to pinpoint when people started collecting cans as a hobby, it is estimated by some that the first beer can collections began around 1935. It is also estimated that one of the first beer can collections was begun by a group of Yale University students and was later kept by one of those students.

Royal Crown Cola started selling their products in "non-returnable" cans in the United States during the 1950s; their competitors Coca-Cola and Pepsi Cola seemed reluctant to use cans at first during that era as their sodas were sold most commonly on glass bottles. Still, Coca-Cola decided to export sodas in cans to Asia, particularly Japan and some other countries across the Pacific Rim, with Pepsi soon following suit. By 1960, approximately 40 different soda brands sold sodas in about 820 million cans every year in the United States alone. Some experts believe this was when soda cans became collectible items.

== Variations ==
There are many types of variations that make cans collectible. These include cans advertising celebrities, sports teams, new film releases, musical tours, and other international events such as the Olympic Games, countries, ideals and other companies and brands that are not related to the industry the can represents.

Also, many times, brands that operate internationally offer cans in different languages or with other variations, depending on the regions in which they operate; these cans are also considered valuable collectable items by some collectors. During the 1980s, Coca-Cola launched a series of cans commemorating the countries in which that brand was sold; many collectors also consider those as collectibles.

Cans can come in different sizes; soda cans can be given or bought in small (sometimes called "mini") sizes, given typically to patients and visitors at hospitals and sometimes to passengers at commercial airline flights, while, on the other hand, petrol companies have sometimes sold very large oil cans. The size of the can can also drive its value among can collectors and their desire to obtain the item.

== Values ==
There are some online pages that keep track of collectable cans' values.

== Records ==
Davide Andreani of Italy is in the Guinness Book of World Records for having the most extensive collection of soda cans of one specific brand in the world, with over 20,000 Coca-Cola cans in his collection (he, however, also owns cans of other brands, so he does not have the record for the largest exclusive Coca-Cola can collection, as explained below). According to a website named canmuseum.com, the largest collection of Pepsi Cola cans belongs to Chris Cavaletti, also of Italy, who owned 12,402 Pepsi Cola cans from 81 countries as of 2022, while the largest exclusive collection of Coca-Cola soda cans belonged to Gary Feng of Canada with 11,308 variations of the Coca-Cola cans from 108 countries collected, with William B. Christensen of the United States owning the largest collection of beer cans with 75,000 from 125 countries and Allan Green, of the United States also, with the largest collection of wine cans, at 449.

== See also ==
- License plate collecting - another type of tin product's collecting
