= License plate collecting =

Hobby of collecting vehicle registration plates

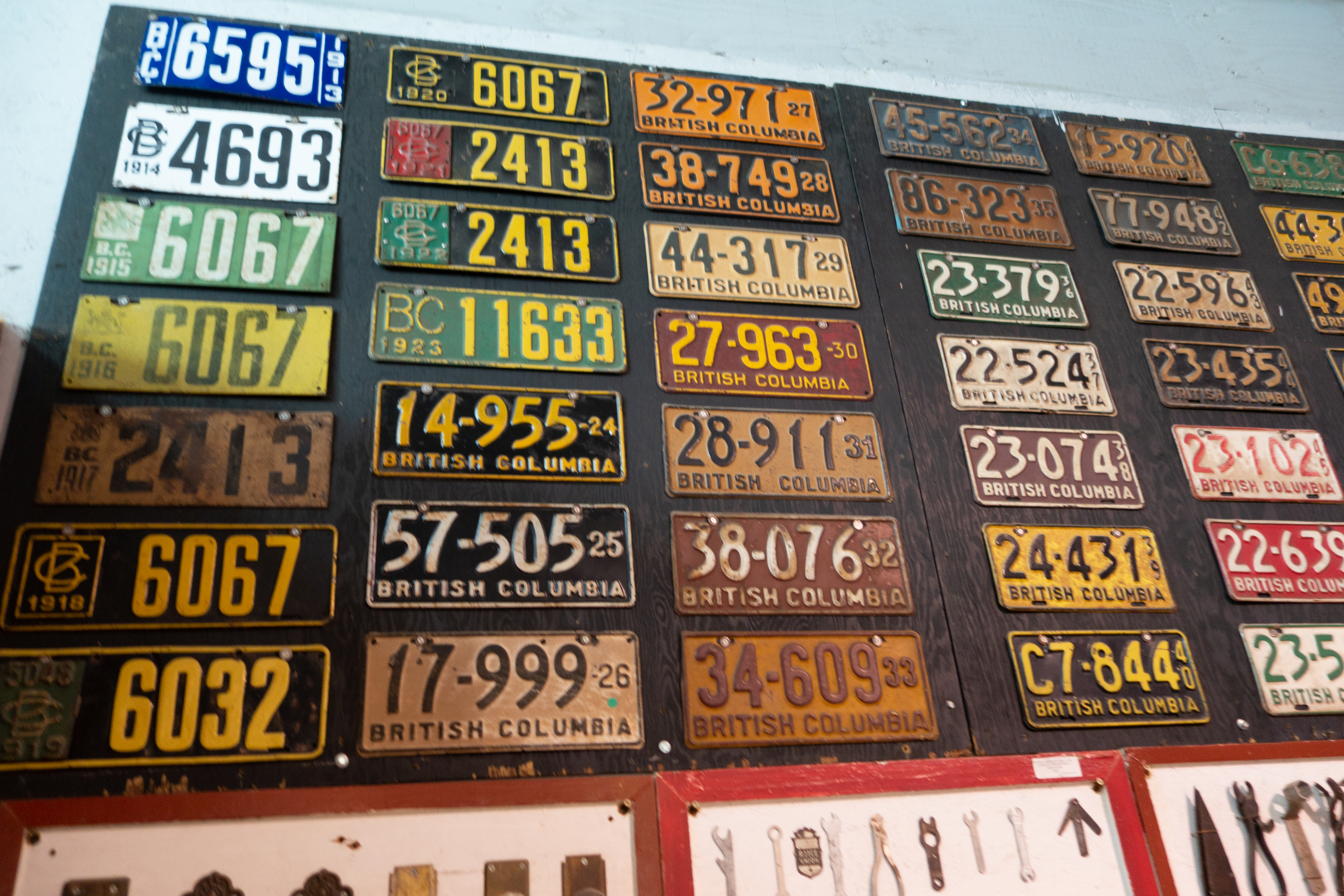
Collection of antique British Columbia license plates

License plate collecting is a hobby that is popular among license plate fans across the world. It is supported by such organizations as the Automobile License Plate Collectors Association.

== History ==
France and Germany in Europe were the first countries to produce license plates.

By the early 1900s, most states in the United States had begun issuing license plates in order to identify cars and match them with their owners. New York was the first state to require license plates on vehicles; this happened in 1903.

These plates were made of porcelain baked onto iron or ceramic, without any backing, which made them fragile.

With time, old license plates would be put away by their original owners, or they would be hung on private garages.

In 1954, the American ALPCA was formed. As of 2024, it counted 2,800 members in 19 different countries.

== Variations ==
License plates are issued around the world. In addition, they are issued also, in many cases, by a country's states, provinces or local regions. In the United States, all 50 states plus territories issue distinct license plates with their names on them.

Also, there are different license plates for private and commercial vehicles.

The large amount of license plates produced yearly across the world gives collectors an opportunity to amass large personal collections.

== See also ==
- Can collecting - another type of tin product's collecting
