= International Registration Plan =

Registration reciprocity agreement

The International Registration Plan (IRP) is a truck registration reciprocity agreement between the contiguous United States and Canadian provinces that provides apportioned payments of registration fees, based on the total distance operated in participating jurisdictions, to them. IRP's fundamental principle is to promote and encourage use of the highway system.

The benefit of this plan is that a carrier may be registered in only their home state, yet legally engage in interstate/interprovincial commerce. Each carrier vehicle needs only one, specially marked "Apportioned", "APP", or "PRP" license plate, and a cab card that lists each jurisdiction the vehicle is allowed to operate in and how much weight it is registered to carry.

Two major transportation companies under IRP are U-Haul and Greyhound Lines.

== Apportionable vehicles ==
The International Registration Plan defines an apportionable vehicle as: any vehicle that is used or intended for use in two or more member jurisdictions and that is used for the transportation of persons for hire or designed, used, or maintained primarily for the transportation of property, and:

(i) has two axles and a gross vehicle weight or registered gross vehicle weight in excess of 26,000 pounds (11,793.401 kilograms), or

(ii) has three or more axles, regardless of weight, or

(iii) is used in combination, when the gross vehicle weight of such combination exceeds 26,000 pounds (11,793.401 kilograms).

Exceptions: Recreational vehicles, vehicles displaying restricted plates, or government-owned vehicles.

Optional: Trucks or truck tractors, or combinations of vehicles having a gross vehicle weight of 26,000 pounds (11,793.401 kilograms), or less.

== Exceptions ==
The exceptions are recreational vehicles, vehicles displaying restricted plates, buses used in the transportation of chartered parties, and government-owned vehicles.
