= Vehicle registration plates of the United States for 1991 =

1991 license plates in the United States

Vehicle registration plates of the United States by year
Vehicle registration plates of the United States for 1990	Events of 1991	Vehicle registration plates of the United States for 1992

Each of the 50 states of the United States of America plus several of its territories and the District of Columbia issued individual passenger license plates for 1991.

== Passenger baseplates ==
Passenger car plates
Image	Region	Design	Slogan	Serial format	Serials issued	Notes
	Alabama					
	Alaska					
	American Samoa	Black letters on white background, image of palm tree at left.	"MOTU O FIAFIAGA" centered at top	1234		
	Arizona					
	Arkansas					
	California					
	Colorado					
	Connecticut					
	Delaware					
	District of Columbia					
	Florida					
	Georgia					
	Guam					
	Hawaii					
	Idaho					
	Illinois					
	Indiana					
	Iowa					
	Kansas	Embossed dark blue serial on reflective white plate; brown wheat stalk graphic screened in the center; pale yellow band screened across top containing stylized "KANSAS" in the center and three dark blue stripes on either side		ABC 123	DVE 000 to approximately GRR 999	Same base as 1988-1990, but state name was revised because of legibility concerns
	Kentucky					
	Louisiana					
	Maine	Embossed navy blue serial on reflective white plate with border line; red American lobster screened behind serial, offset to right; "MAINE" screened in red centered at top.	"Vacationland" (with enlarged 'V') screened in red centered at bottom	1234AB		Double-letter series issued first (AA, BB, CC, up to ZZ), followed by different-letter series (AB, AC, AD etc.) from September 1991.
	Maryland					
	Massachusetts					
	Michigan					
	Minnesota					
	Mississippi					
	Missouri					
	Montana					
	Nebraska					
	Nevada					
	New Hampshire					
	New Jersey					
	New Mexico					
	New York					
	North Carolina					
	North Dakota					
	Northern Mariana; Islands					
	Ohio	Embossed blue serial with state-shaped separator on reflective white plate; "OHIO" screened in blue centered at top.	"the heart of it all!" screened in red between state name and serial	ABC•123		
	Oklahoma					
	Oregon					
	Pennsylvania					
	Puerto Rico	Black on reflective white with fort graphic	"Isla Del Encanto" centered at bottom	ABC 123		
	Rhode Island					
	South Carolina					
	South Dakota					
	Tennessee					
	Texas					
	Utah					
	Vermont					
	Virginia	Embossed dark blue serial on reflective white plate with border line; "Virginia" screened in blue centered at top.	None	ABC-123		Still currently revalidated.
	Washington	personalized license plate "Saluton", "Hello" in Esperanto ("centennial celebration" refers to Washington's statehood, 1889-1989)				Personalized plate shown.
	West Virginia	Embossed dark blue serial on reflective white plate; yellow state shape screened at left behind serial; "WEST VIRGINIA" screened in dark blue centered at bottom.	Dark blue bar screened at top with "Wild, Wonderful" in white in the center			
	Wisconsin					
	Wyoming					

== Non-passenger plates ==
Non-passenger Plates
Image (standard)	Region	Type	Design and slogan	Serial format	Serials issued	Notes

== See also ==
- Antique vehicle registration
- Electronic license plate
- Motor vehicle registration
- Vehicle license
