= Vehicle registration plates of the United States for 1992 =

1992 license plates in the United States

Vehicle registration plates of the United States by year
Vehicle registration plates of the United States for 1991	Events of 1992	Vehicle registration plates of the United States for 1993

Each of the 50 states of the United States of America plus several of its territories and the District of Columbia issued individual passenger license plates for 1992.

== Passenger baseplates ==
Passenger car plates
Image	Region	Design	Slogan	Serial format	Serials issued	Notes
	Alabama	Embossed blue serial on reflective white plate; "ALABAMA" screened in blue centered at top, with blue line on either side.	"Heart of Dixie" screened in red centered between state name and serial, with heart outline around the "of"			
	Alaska	Embossed blue serial on reflective golden yellow plate; screened state flag in the center; "ALASKA" screened in blue centered at top; indented top corners for revalidation stickers	"The Last Frontier" screened in blue centered at bottom	ABC 123		
	American Samoa	Black letters on white background, image of palm tree at left.	"MOTU O FIAFIAGA" centered at top	1234		
	Arizona	Embossed reflective white serial with saguaro cactus separator on maroon plate with border line; "ARIZONA" centered at top.	"GRAND CANYON STATE" centered at bottom	ABC-123		
	Arkansas	Embossed blue serial on reflective white plate; red band screened at top containing "Arkansas" in white in the center.	"The Natural State" screened in red centered at bottom	ABC 123		
	California	Blue on reflective white with embossed red state name centered at top.	None	1ABC123		
	Colorado	Embossed white on reflective green; mountains at top.	None			
	Connecticut	Embossed reflective (glass-beaded) white serial on blue plate with border line; "CONNECTICUT" centered at top with embossed state shape at top left.	"CONSTITUTION STATE" at bottom			
	Delaware	Screened gold numbers on reflective dark blue plate with gold border; "DELAWARE" centered at bottom.	"THE FIRST STATE" centered at top	123456		Several variations of the font used for the serial exist. Some replacement plates have riveted numbers.
	District of Columbia	Embossed blue serial on reflective white plate; screened district flag used as separator; screened red stripes above and below serial; "Washington, D.C." screened in blue centered at bottom; debossed sticker boxes in bottom corners.	"Celebrate & Discover" screened in blue centered at top	123-456		
	Florida					
	Georgia	Embossed black on reflective gradient white and orange; screened green "Georgia" at top with peach graphic for the 'o'; "19" at top left and "90" at top right; county name on sticker at bottom.	None	ABC 123		
	Guam					
	Hawaii	Black on reflective white with rainbow graphic	"ALOHA STATE" at bottom			
	Idaho					
	Illinois	"Dark blue on reflective white with light and dark blue stripes; state name screened in dark blue at top left"	"Land of Lincoln" screened at top right corner	123 456	AB 1234	Reissues of 1979–82 serials
	Indiana	Red serial on reflective white background	"Hoosier Hospitality" centered at bottom			Small white-on-blue county name sticker in bottom right corner as on the Back Home Again base. Allen County began issuing two-letter, three-digit serials in 1992 after reaching 2Z9999. Plates were valid through October 31, 1993.
	Iowa					
	Kansas	Embossed dark blue serial on reflective white plate with golden brown wheat stalk in center; "KANSAS" screened in yellow and dark blue at top center, county sticker on top left and year registration sticker well on the top right.		ABC 123	DVE 000 to approximately GRR 999	
	Kentucky					
	Louisiana					
	Maine	Embossed navy blue serial on reflective white plate with border line; red American lobster screened behind serial, offset to right; "MAINE" screened in red centered at top.	"Vacationland" (with enlarged 'V') screened in red centered at bottom	1234AB		
	Maryland	Embossed black numbers on white plate; shield with the design of the Maryland state flag screened in the center; "Maryland" screened in black centered at top	None	ABC 123		Modification of the optional 350th Anniversary base introduced in 1983. Two-year renewals started on July 1, 1992.
	Massachusetts	Embossed green serial on reflective white plate with border line; "MASSACHUSETTS" centered at top	None	123·456		
	Michigan	Embossed reflective (glass-beaded) white serial on blue plate; "MICHIGAN" centered at top	"GREAT LAKES" centered at bottom	ABC 123	AAA 000 to UDT 999	
	Minnesota					
	Mississippi					
	Missouri					
	Montana					
	Nebraska					
	Nevada					
	New Hampshire					
	New Jersey					
	New Mexico					
	New York	Liberty plates. Embossed dark blue serial on reflective white plate, with red stripes at top and bottom; red Statue of Liberty graphic screened in center (or at left on vanity plates); "NEW YORK" screened in dark blue centered at top	None			Validated with windshield decal.
	North Carolina					
	North Dakota	Embossed black serial on light blue, white and light orange gradient plate; long black bar screened below serial with "NORTH DAKOTA" in white in the center, "1889" to the left and "1989" to the right.	Short black bar screened above serial with "CENTENNIAL" in white in the center; "PEACE GARDEN STATE" screened in black centered at top	ABC 123	BAA 000 to approximately CNP 999	
	Northern Mariana; Islands					
	Ohio	Embossed blue serial with state-shaped separator on reflective white plate; "OHIO" screened in blue centered at top.	"the heart of it all!" screened in red between state name and serial	ABC•123		
	Oklahoma					
	Oregon					
	Pennsylvania	Reflective yellow on blue with small keystone separator	"Keystone State" centered at top	ABC-1234		
	Puerto Rico					
	Rhode Island					
	South Carolina					
	South Dakota					
	Tennessee	Embossed red serial on reflective white plate; blue circle with three white stars (from the state flag) screened in the center; "Tennessee" screened in blue centered at top; county name on blue sticker centered at bottom.	County name centered at bottom	ABC 123		
	Texas	Dark blue and red on reflective white; state flag screened to left of state name.	"THE LONE STAR STATE" screened centered at bottom	ABC-12D		
	Utah					
	Vermont	Debossed white serial on green plate; screened white rectangular box around serial; "Vermont" screened in white centered at top; white sugar maple screened at top left.	"Green Mountain State" screened in white centered at bottom	ABC 123		
	Virginia	Embossed dark blue serial on reflective white plate with border line; "Virginia" screened in blue centered at top	None	ABC-123		Still currently revalidated.
	Washington	Embossed dark blue serial on reflective white plate with light blue Mount Rainier graphic and dark blue border line; "Washington" screened in red centered at top.	None	123-ABC		
	West Virginia	Embossed dark blue serial on reflective white plate; yellow state shape screened at left behind serial; "WEST VIRGINIA" screened in dark blue centered at bottom.	Dark blue bar screened at top with "Wild, Wonderful" in white in the center		First character corresponds to month of expiration	
	Wisconsin	Embossed red serial on reflective white plate; "WISCONSIN" screened in dark blue at top left and graphics screened at top right featuring a sailboat and sunset, flying geese, and a farm scene; green and dark blue lines separating state name and graphics from serial.	"America's Dairyland" screened in dark blue centered at bottom	ABC-123		
	Wyoming	Embossed red serial and Bucking Horse and Rider on graphic plate featuring white cloud-covered mountains against a blue sky; "Wyoming" screened in dark blue at top, offset to right.	"1890 Centennial 1990" screened in dark blue at bottom			

== Non-passenger plates ==
Non-passenger Plates
Image (standard)	Region	Type	Design and slogan	Serial format	Serials issued	Notes

== See also ==
- Antique vehicle registration
- Electronic license plate
- Motor vehicle registration
- Vehicle license
