= Vehicle registration plates of the United States for 1993 =

1993 license plates in the United States

Vehicle registration plates of the United States by year
Vehicle registration plates of the United States for 1992	Events of 1993	Vehicle registration plates of the United States for 1994

Each of the 50 states of the United States of America plus several of its territories and the District of Columbia issued individual passenger license plates for 1993.

== Passenger baseplates ==
Passenger car plates
Image	Region	Design	Slogan	Serial format	Serials issued	Notes
	Alabama	Embossed blue serial on reflective white plate; "ALABAMA" screened in blue centered at top, with blue line on either side	"Heart of Dixie" screened in red centered between state name and serial, with heart outline around the "of"			
	Alaska					
	American Samoa	Black letters on white background, image of palm tree at left.	"MOTU O FIAFIAGA" centered at top	1234		
	Arizona					
	Arkansas					
	California					
	Colorado	Embossed white on reflective green; mountains at top.	None			
	Connecticut					
	Delaware					
	District of Columbia					
	Florida					
	Georgia		None			
	Georgia		Centennial Olympic Games			
	Guam					
	Hawaii					
	Idaho					
	Illinois					
	Indiana					
	Iowa					
	Kansas	Embossed dark blue serial on reflective white plate; brown wheat stalk graphic screened in the center; pale yellow band screened across top containing stylized "KANSAS" in the center and three dark blue stripes on either side		ABC 123	DVE 000 to approximately GRR 999	
	Kentucky					
	Louisiana					
	Maine					
	Maryland					
	Massachusetts					
	Michigan					
	Minnesota					
	Mississippi					
	Missouri					
	Montana					
	Nebraska					
	Nevada					
	New Hampshire					
	New Jersey					
	New Mexico					
	New York					
	North Carolina					
	North Dakota					
	Northern Mariana; Islands					
	Ohio	Embossed blue serial with state-shaped separator on reflective white plate; "OHIO" screened in blue centered at top.	"the heart of it all!" screened in red between state name and serial	ABC•123		
	Oklahoma					
	Oregon					
	Pennsylvania					
	Puerto Rico					
	Rhode Island					
	South Carolina					
	South Dakota					
	Tennessee					
	Texas					
	U.S. Virgin Islands					
	Utah					
	Vermont					
	Virginia	Embossed dark blue serial on reflective white plate; "Virginia" screened in blue centered at top.	None	ABC-1234	ZZZ-9999 to approximately ZXX-1000	Serials progressed backwards, presumably due to the serials on the optional Scenic plate progressing forward from AAA-1000.
	Washington	Embossed dark blue serial on reflective white plate with light blue Mount Rainier graphic and dark blue border line; "Washington" screened in red centered at top.	None	123-ABC		
	West Virginia	Embossed dark blue serial on reflective white plate; yellow state shape screened at left behind serial; "WEST VIRGINIA" screened in dark blue centered at bottom.	Dark blue bar screened at top with "Wild, Wonderful" in white in the center			
	Wisconsin					
	Wyoming					

== Non-passenger plates ==
Non-passenger Plates
Image (standard)	Region	Type	Design & Slogan	Serial format	Serials issued	Notes

== See also ==
- Antique vehicle registration
- Electronic license plate
- Motor vehicle registration
- Vehicle license
