= Vehicle registration plates of South Dakota =

South Dakota vehicle license plates

South Dakota
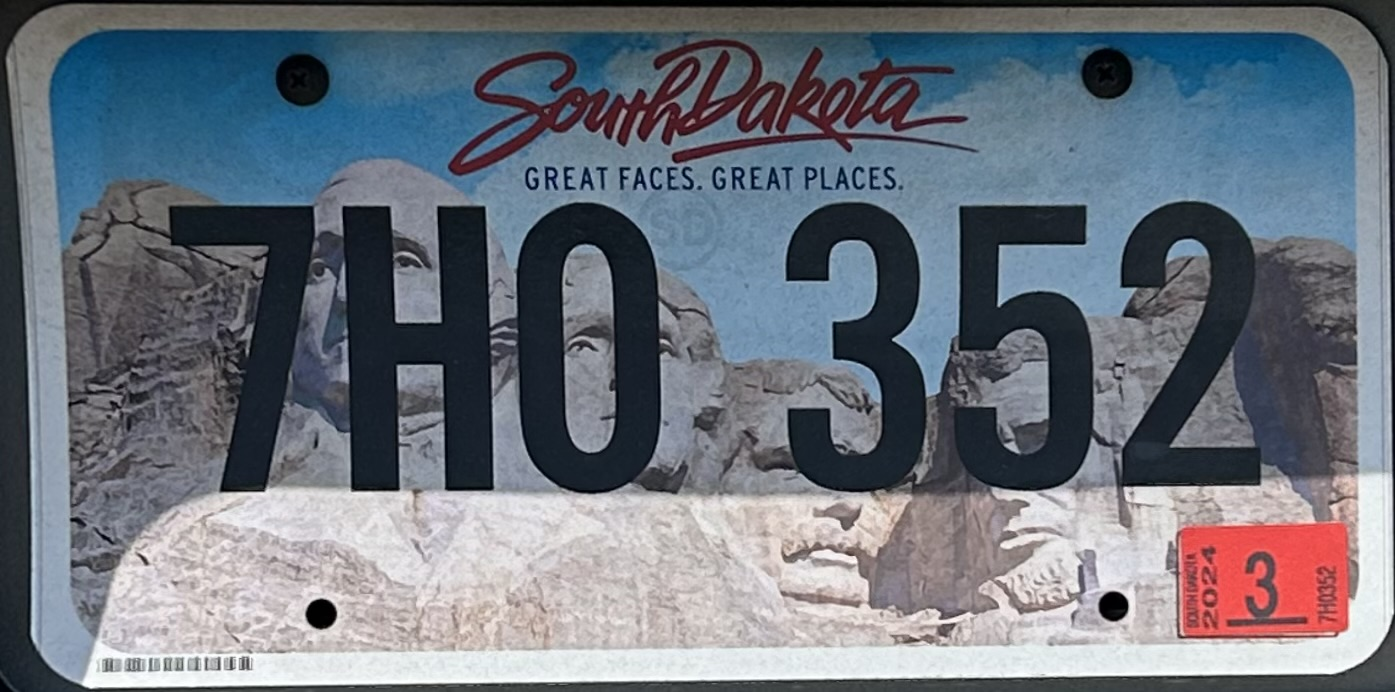

Current series
- Slogan: Great Faces. Great Places.
- Size: 12 in × 6 in 30 cm × 15 cm
- Material: Aluminum
- Serial format: 1A1 234; 1AB 123; 10A 123; 10A B12; 44A BC1 (county-coded)
- Introduced: January 2023

Availability
- Issued by: South Dakota Department of Revenue, Motor Vehicle Division

History
- First issued: July 1, 1913 (pre-state plates from 1905 through June 30, 1913)

The U.S. state of South Dakota first required its residents to register their motor vehicles in 1905. Registrants provided their own license plates for display until 1913, when the state began to issue plates.

As of 2026, plates are issued by the South Dakota Department of Revenue through its Motor Vehicle Division. Front and rear plates are required for most classes of vehicles, while only rear plates are required for motorcycles and trailers.

== Passenger baseplates ==
=== Prestate ===
Image	Dates issued	Description	Serial format	Serials issued	Notes
	1905 to 1912 (prestate)	Riveted metal numbers on black leather plate, "SD" riveted on right	12345	1 to approximately 13500	

=== 1913 to 1975 ===
In 1956, the United States, Canada, and Mexico came to an agreement with the American Association of Motor Vehicle Administrators, the Automobile Manufacturers Association and the National Safety Council that standardized the size for license plates for vehicles (except those for motorcycles) at 6 inches (15 cm) in height by 12 inches (30 cm) in width, with standardized mounting holes. The 1955 (dated 1956) issue was the first South Dakota license plate that complied with these standards.

Image	Dates issued	Design	Slogan	Serial format	Serials issued	Notes
	1913	Embossed black on white; vertical "SD" at right	none	12345	1 to approximately 14100	
	1914	Embossed white on red; vertical "SD" at right	none	12345	1 to approximately 20800	
	1915	Embossed yellow on black; vertical "SD" at right	none	12345	1 to approximately 28700	
	1916	Embossed light green on black; "SD 1916" at right	none	12345	1 to approximately 43000	First dated plate.
	1917	Embossed beige on brown; vertical "SD" and "1917" at left and right respectively	none	12345	1 to approximately 67000	
	1918	Embossed brown on beige; vertical "SD" and "1918" at left and right respectively	none	12345	1 to approximately 84000	
	1919	Embossed silver on olive green with border line; vertical "SD" and "1919" at left and right respectively	none	123456	1 to approximately 105000	
	1920	Embossed maroon on cream with border line; vertical "SD" and "20" at left and right respectively	none	123456	30000 to approximately 139000	Serials below 30000 reserved for motorcycles and trucks. This practice continued through 1923.
	1921	Embossed white on green; lines at top and bottom borders; vertical "SD" and "21" at left and right respectively	none	123456	30000 to approximately 154000	
	1922	Embossed white on dark blue; lines at top and bottom borders; vertical "SD" and "22" at left and right respectively	none	123456	30000 to approximately 150000	
	1923	Embossed black on gray with border line; vertical "SD" and "23" at left and right respectively	none	123-456	30-000 to approximately 153-000	
	1924	Embossed silver on black with border line; vertical "SD" and "24" at left and right respectively	none	123-456	20-000 to approximately 151-000	Serials below 20-000 reserved for motorcycles and trucks.
	1925	Embossed black on tan with border line; vertical "25" and "SD" at left and right respectively	none	1-1234; 10-1234	Coded by county of issuance (1 or 10)	First use of county codes.
	1926	Embossed black on silver with border line; vertical "SD" and "26" at left and right respectively	none	1-1234; 10-1234	Coded by county of issuance (1 or 10)	
	1927	Embossed black on turquoise with border line; vertical "27" and "SD" at left and right respectively	none	1-1234; 10-1234	Coded by county of issuance (1 or 10)	
	1928	Embossed white on red with border line; vertical "SD" and "28" at left and right respectively	none	1-1234; 10-1234	Coded by county of issuance (1 or 10)	
	1929	Embossed white on green with border line; vertical "29" and "SD" at left and right respectively	none	1-1234; 10-1234	Coded by county of issuance (1 or 10)	
	1930	Embossed black on yellow with border line; vertical "SD" and "30" at left and right respectively	none	1-1234; 10-1234	Coded by county of issuance (1 or 10)	
	1931	Embossed black on white with border line; vertical "31" and "SD" at left and right respectively	none	1-1234; 10-1234	Coded by county of issuance (1 or 10)	
	1932	Embossed yellow on black with border line; vertical "SD" and "32" at left and right respectively	none	1-1234; 10-1234	Coded by county of issuance (1 or 10)	
	1933	Embossed black on yellow with border line; "S. DAK. 1933" at bottom	none	1-1234; 10-1234	Coded by county of issuance (1 or 10)	
	1934	Embossed yellow on black with border line; "S. DAK. 1934" at bottom	none	1-1234; 10-1234	Coded by county of issuance (1 or 10)	
	1935	Embossed black on yellow with border line; "S. DAK. 1935" at top	none	1-1234; 10-1234	Coded by county of issuance (1 or 10)	
	1936	Embossed white on brick red with border line; "S. DAK. 1936" at top	none	1-1234; 10-1234	Coded by county of issuance (1 or 10)	
	1937	Embossed red on white with border line; "S. DAK. 1937" at bottom	none	1-1234; 10-1234	Coded by county of issuance (1 or 10)	
	1938	Embossed white on blue with border line; "S. DAK. 1938" at bottom	none	1-1234; 10-1234	Coded by county of issuance (1 or 10)	
	1939	Embossed blue on white; "SD" at bottom left and "39" at bottom right	"RUSHMORE MEMORIAL" at bottom center	1-1234; 10-1234	Coded by county of issuance (1 or 10)	
	1940	Embossed black on golden yellow; "SOUTH DAKOTA 1940" at top	none	1-1234; 10-1234	Coded by county of issuance (1 or 10)	First use of the full state name.
	1941	Embossed golden yellow on black; "SOUTH DAKOTA 1941" at bottom	none	1-1234; 10-1234	Coded by county of issuance (1 or 10)	
	1942–44	Embossed black on golden yellow; "SOUTH DAKOTA 1942" at top	none	1-1234; 10-1234	Coded by county of issuance (1 or 10)	Revalidated for 1943 with black tabs, and for 1944 with windshield stickers, due to metal conservation for World War II.
	1945	Embossed green on white with border line; "SOUTH DAKOTA 1945" at bottom	none	1-1234; 10-1234	Coded by county of issuance (1 or 10)	
	1946	Embossed white on black with border line; "SOUTH DAKOTA 1946" at top	none	1-1234; 10-1234	Coded by county of issuance (1 or 10)	
	1947	Embossed black on unpainted aluminum with border line; "1947 SOUTH DAKOTA" at top	none	1-1234; 10-1234	Coded by county of issuance (1 or 10)	
	1948	Embossed red on unpainted aluminum with border line; "SOUTH DAKOTA 1948" at top	none	1-1234; 10-1234	Coded by county of issuance (1 or 10)	
	1949	Embossed blue on waffle-textured unpainted aluminum with border line; "1949 SOUTH DAKOTA" at top	none	1-1234; 10-1234	Coded by county of issuance (1 or 10)	
	1950	Embossed black on orange with border line; "SOUTH DAKOTA '50" at top	none	1-1234; 1-A123; 10-123; 10-A12; 10-1A2; 10-12A	Coded by county of issuance (1 or 10)	
	1951	Embossed orange on black with border line; "'51 SOUTH DAKOTA" at top	none	1-1234; 1-A123; 10-123; 10-A12; 10-1A2; 10-12A	Coded by county of issuance (1 or 10)	
	1952	Embossed maroon on beige with border line; "S.DAK", Mount Rushmore decal and "1952" at top	none	1-1234; 1-A123; 10-123; 10-A12; 10-1A2; 10-12A	Coded by county of issuance (1 or 10)	First base to feature a graphic of Mount Rushmore in any form.
	1953	Embossed beige on maroon with border line; "1953", Mount Rushmore decal and "S.DAK" at top	none	1-1234; 1-A123; 10-1234; 10-A123	Coded by county of issuance (1 or 10)	
	1954	Embossed black on white with border line; "S.DAK.", Mount Rushmore decal and "1954" at top	none	1-1234; 1-A123; 10-1234; 10-A123	Coded by county of issuance (1 or 10)	
	1955	Embossed white on green with border line; "1955", Mount Rushmore decal and "S.DAK" at top	none	1-1234; 1-A123; 10-1234; 10-A123	Coded by county of issuance (1 or 10)	
	1956	Embossed green on beige with border line; "S.DAK.", Mount Rushmore decal and "1956" at top	none	1-12345; 10-1234	Coded by county of issuance (1 or 10)	First 6" x 12" plate.
	1957–59	Embossed black on reflective white with border line; "S.DAK.", stamped Mount Rushmore graphic and "57" at top	none	1-12345; 10-1234	Coded by county of issuance (1 or 10)	Revalidated for 1958 with maroon tabs, and for 1959 with red tabs.
	1960	Embossed black on reflective tan with border line; "S.DAK.", stamped Mount Rushmore graphic and "60" at top	none	1-12345; 10-1234	Coded by county of issuance (1 or 10)	
	1961	Embossed green on reflective white with border line; "S.DAK.", stamped Mount Rushmore graphic and "61" at top	none	1-12345; 10-1234	Coded by county of issuance (1 or 10)	
	1962	Embossed black on reflective white with border line; "S.DAK.", stamped Mount Rushmore graphic and "62" at bottom	none	1-12345; 10-1234	Coded by county of issuance (1 or 10)	
	1963	Embossed red on reflective white with border line; "S.DAK.", stamped Mount Rushmore graphic and "63" at top	none	1-12345; 10-1234	Coded by county of issuance (1 or 10)	
	1964	Embossed dark blue on reflective white with border line; "S.DAK.", stamped Mount Rushmore graphic and "64" at bottom	none	1-12345; 10-1234	Coded by county of issuance (1 or 10)	
	1965	Embossed green on reflective white with border line; "S.DAK.", stamped Mount Rushmore graphic and "65" at top	none	1-12345; 10-1234	Coded by county of issuance (1 or 10)	
	1966	Embossed dark blue on reflective white with border line; "S.DAK.", stamped Mount Rushmore graphic and "66" at bottom	none	1-12345; 10-1234	Coded by county of issuance (1 or 10)	
	1967	Embossed maroon on reflective white with border line; "S.DAK.", stamped Mount Rushmore graphic and "67" at top	none	1-12345; 10-1234	Coded by county of issuance (1 or 10)	
	1968	Embossed light blue on reflective white with border line; "S.DAK.", stamped Mount Rushmore graphic and "68" at bottom	none	1-12345; 10-1234	Coded by county of issuance (1 or 10)	
	1969	Embossed orange on reflective white with border line; "S.DAK.", stamped Mount Rushmore graphic and "69" at top	none	1-12345; 10-1234	Coded by county of issuance (1 or 10)	
	1970	Embossed dark blue on reflective white with border line; "S.DAK.", stamped Mount Rushmore graphic and "70" at bottom	none	1-12345; 10-1234	Coded by county of issuance (1 or 10)	
	1971	Embossed green on reflective white with border line; "S.DAK.", stamped Mount Rushmore graphic and "71" at top	none	1-12345; 10-1234	Coded by county of issuance (1 or 10)	
	1972	Embossed black on reflective white with border line; "S.DAK.", stamped Mount Rushmore graphic and "72" at top	none	1-12345; 10-1234	Coded by county of issuance (1 or 10)	
	1973	Embossed red on reflective white with border line; "S.DAK.", stamped Mount Rushmore graphic and "73" at top	none	1-12345; 10-1234	Coded by county of issuance (1 or 10)	
	1974	Embossed blue on reflective white with screened red and black Mount Rushmore graphic at bottom	none	1-12345; 10-1234	Coded by county of issuance (1 or 10)	First screened graphic license plate in the United States. Awarded "Plate of the Year" for best new license plate of 1974 by the Automobile License Plate Collectors Association, the first time South Dakota was so honored.
	1974	Embossed blue on reflective white with stamped Mount Rushmore graphic at bottom	none	1-12345; 10-1234	Coded by county of issuance (1 or 10)	Issued in counties that had exhausted their supplies of screened graphic plates.
	1975	Embossed red on reflective white with screened light blue and black Mount Rushmore graphic at bottom	none	1-12345; 10-1234	Coded by county of issuance (1 or 10)	

=== 1976 to present ===
Image	Dates issued	Design	Slogan	Serial format	Serials issued	Notes
	1976–80	Embossed blue on reflective white with screened blue and white Mount Rushmore graphic and three red stripes at top	none	AB:1234	Coded by county of issuance (AB)	
	1981–86	Embossed red on reflective white with screened dark blue Mount Rushmore graphic at bottom right; county name on sticker at top	none	ABC:123	AAA:001 to BRP:599; CAB:001 to approximately KAS:888 (see right)	Awarded "Plate of the Year" for best new license plate of 1981 by the Automobile License Plate Collectors Association, the second time South Dakota was so honored. Letter Q not used in serials; all three-letter combinations from 1983 onwards were consonant-vowel-consonant.
	1987–90	Embossed red on reflective white with screened blue Mount Rushmore graphic at bottom right	Celebrate the Century (optional)	1AB 123; 10A 123	Coded by county of issuance (1 or 10)	Commemorated South Dakota's 100 years of statehood. Numeric county codes reintroduced. Letters I, O and Q not used in serials; this practice continues today.
	1990–95	Embossed green on reflective gradient gold and white with Mount Rushmore graphic at top right	Great Faces. Great Places.	1A 1234; 10 A123; 10 AB12	Coded by county of issuance (1 or 10)	
	1996 – December 1999	Embossed green on reflective white with large gold Mount Rushmore graphic in background	Great Faces. Great Places.	1A12345; 10A1234	Coded by county of issuance (1 or 10)	
	January 2000 – late 2003	Embossed blue on reflective red, white and blue with blue Mount Rushmore graphic at bottom	none	1AB 123; 10A 123; 10A B12	Coded by county of issuance (1 or 10)	
	late 2003 – December 2005	As above, but with serial screened	none	1AB 123; 10A 123; 10A B12	Coded by county of issuance (1 or 10)	
	January 2006 – December 2015	Screened dark blue on reflective full-color Mount Rushmore graphic	Great Faces. Great Places.	1AB 123; 1AB C12; 10A 123; 10A B12; 10A BC1	Coded by county of issuance (1 or 10)	Awarded "Plate of the Year" for best new license plate of 2006 by the Automobile License Plate Collectors Association, the third time South Dakota was so honored. Serials in each county continued from where the 2000 base left off.
	January 2016 – December 2022	Screened dark blue on reflective beige Mount Rushmore graphic	Great Faces. Great Places.	1A1 234; 1AB 123; 10A 123; 10A B12; 44A BC1	Coded by county of issuance (1 or 10)	
	January 2023 – present	Screened black serial on reflective full-color Mount Rushmore graphic and blue sky	Great Faces. Great Places.	1A1 234; 1AB 123; 10A 123; 10A B12; 44A BC1	Coded by county of issuance (1 or 10)	Serials in each county continued from where the 2016 base left off.

== Non-passenger plates ==
=== 2006 to present ===
Image	Type	Design	Slogan	Serial format	Notes
	City Government	Modified blue Mount Rushmore base.	none	CTY1234	
	Commercial	Modified blue Mount Rushmore base.	none	12345 A	
	County Government	Modified blue Mount Rushmore base.	none	CO 1234; CO12345	
	Fire Department	Modified blue Mount Rushmore base.	none	FD 1234	
	School	Modified blue Mount Rushmore base.	none	S 1234	
	Oglala Sioux Tribe government	Modified blue Mount Rushmore base.	none	OST 123; OST1234	
	State Government	Modified blue Mount Rushmore base.	none	AB123	State seal at left, state flag bottom right corner.

== Optional plates ==
Image	Type	Design	Slogan	Serial format	Notes
	Veteran	Modified blue Mount Rushmore base.	VETERAN	1234A	Logo for branch of service at left.
	Dignity (statue)	Dignity of Earth & Sky sculpture	Great Faces, Great Places	Y1234	
	Firefighter	Maltese Cross, flames	Firefighter	FF 1234	
	Organizational	Modified Mount Rushmore base.	Great Faces, Great Places	A1234 AB123 ABC12 ABCD1	Organizational decal purchased separately.
	Tribal	Red on white with tribal logo on left side.		A123	Nine tribes available.
	Rear Plate Only	White upper, gray lower.	Rear Plate Only	SI 1234	Limited to 7500 miles per year.

== County coding ==
County	1925–55	1956–75, 1987–present	1976–80
Minnehaha	1	1	MA, ME, MH, MN, MO, MX, MZ
Pennington	51	2	PA, PB, PE, PG, PN, PX, PY, PZ
Brown	7	3	BN, BR, BW
Beadle	3	4	BD, BE
Codington	15	5	CD, CT
Brookings	6	6	BG, BK
Yankton	63	7	YA, YN
Davison	18	8	DN, DV
Lawrence	41	9	LA, LW
Aurora	2	10	AU
Bennett	4	11	BT
Bon Homme	5	12	BH
Brule	8	13	BL
Buffalo	9	14	BF
Butte	10	15	BU
Campbell	11	16	CA
Charles Mix	12	17	CM
Clark	13	18	CK
Clay	14	19	CL
Corson	16	20	CN
Custer	17	21	CU
Day	19	22	DA
Deuel	20	23	DU
Dewey	21	24	DW
Douglas	22	25	DG
Edmunds	23	26	ED
Fall River	24	27	FR
Faulk	25	28	FA
Grant	26	29	GT
Gregory	27	30	GY
Haakon	28	31	HK
Hamlin	29	32	HN
Hand	30	33	HD
Hanson	31	34	HS
Harding	32	35	HR
Hughes	33	36	HU
Hutchinson	34	37	HT
Hyde	35	38	HY
Jackson	36	39	JA
Jerauld	37	40	JE
Jones	38	41	JN
Kingsbury	39	42	KG
Lake	40	43	LK
Lincoln	42	44	LN
Lyman	43	45	LY
McCook	44	46	MC
McPherson	45	47	MP
Marshall	46	48	ML
Meade	47	49	MD
Mellette	48	50	MT
Miner	49	51	MR
Moody	50	52	MY
Perkins	52	53	PK
Potter	53	54	PT
Roberts	54	55	RB
Sanborn	55	56	SA
Spink	56	57	SP
Stanley	57	58	ST
Sully	58	59	SU
Tripp	59	60	TR
Turner	60	61	TU
Union	61	62	UN
Walworth	62	63	WL
Ziebach	64	64	ZB
Shannon / Oglala Lakota	–	65	SN
Washabaugh (until 1983)	–	66	WB
Todd	–	67	TD
