= Vehicle registration plates of Alabama =

Alabama vehicle license plates

Alabama
Current series
- Slogan: Heart of Dixie
- Size: 12 in × 6 in 30 cm × 15 cm
- Material: Aluminum
- Serial format: 1A2345B; 1A23BCD; 1A23B4C; 10A123B; 10A12B3; 10A1B23; 10A1BC2; 10A2BCD; 10ABCDE (county-coded)
- Introduced: January 3, 2022

Availability
- Issued by: Alabama Department of Revenue

History
- First issued: October 1, 1911

The U.S. state of Alabama first required its residents to register their motor vehicles and display license plates in 1911.

As of 2026, plates are issued by the Alabama Department of Revenue. Only rear plates have been required on standard passenger vehicles since 1963.

== History ==
Some Alabama municipalities issued their own license plates for horse-drawn vehicles as well as automobiles prior to 1911. The earliest known plate is a bronze plate, "No. 1", issued by the city of Bessemer on a two-horse wagon in 1901, while the earliest known plate for an automobile is a 1906 dash plate issued by the city of Birmingham, originally assigned to a 1904 6-cylinder Ford. Between 1909 and 1911, Birmingham and Mobile issued annual plates made of porcelain-coated steel, while Montgomery, the state capital, issued a similar plate only in 1909. Dothan also issued a porcelain plate in 1911.

The state first issued annual license plates on October 1, 1911, with plate #1 being issued to the Leak Funeral Home in Montgomery. Until 1980, the license year was October 1 to September 30. Porcelain plates were originally used, before the state switched to embossed metal plates in 1915. The 1916–17 plate was the first to feature the year of expiration, while the 1921–22 plate was the first to use a horsepower class system, with each class denoted by a letter. Kilby Prison near Montgomery took charge of all plate manufacture in 1928.

In 1933, the horsepower classes were replaced by weight classes, using the same letter system; these lasted until 1952. County coding was introduced in 1941.

A 1951 law added a heart shape and the phrase "Heart of Dixie" to the state's license plates (beginning with the 1954–55 plate), adopting a slogan created by the Alabama Chamber of Commerce. The heart motif and slogan remain in use on all standard-issue plates today.

In 1956, the United States, Canada, and Mexico came to an agreement with the American Association of Motor Vehicle Administrators, the Automobile Manufacturers Association and the National Safety Council that standardized the size for license plates for vehicles (except those for motorcycles) at 6 inches (15 cm) in height by 12 inches (30 cm) in width, with standardized mounting holes. The 1955 (dated 1956) issue was the first Alabama license plate that complied with these standards.

Since 1980, Alabama has used a staggered registration system based on the first letter of the registrant's last name. Registrations expire January through November, with fleet, leased, and commercial vehicles expiring in November.

== Passenger baseplates ==
=== 1911 to 1976 ===
Image	Dates issued	Design	Slogan	Serial format	Serials issued	Notes
	1911–12	White serial on blue porcelain plate; vertical "ALA" at left	none	1234	1 to approximately 4000	
	1912–13	Black serial on orange porcelain plate; vertical "ALA" at left	none	1234	1 to approximately 4800	
	1913–14	Black serial on white porcelain plate; vertical "ALA" at left	none	1234	1 to approximately 8300	
	1914–15	White serial on green porcelain plate; vertical "ALA" at left	none	12345	1 to approximately 12100	
	1915–16	Embossed black serial on yellow plate; vertical "ALA" at left	none	12345	1 to 10000; 15001 to approximately 24100	First embossed plate.
	1916–17	Embossed red serial on white plate; vertical "ALA" and "1917" at left and right respectively	none	12345	1 to 25000; 35001 to approximately 36600	First dated plate.
	1917–18	Embossed blue serial on gray plate; vertical "1918" and "ALA" at left and right respectively	none	12345	1 to approximately 30200	
	1918–19	Embossed white serial on dark green plate with border line; vertical "ALA" and "19" at left and right respectively	none	12345	00001 to approximately 49500	
	1919–20	Embossed black serial on white plate with border line; vertical "20" and "ALA" at left and right respectively	none	12345	00001 to approximately 64700	
	1920–21	Embossed red serial on white plate with border line; vertical "21" and "ALA" at left and right respectively	none	12345	00001 to approximately 69600	
	1921–22	Embossed black serial on yellow plate with border line; vertical "ALA" and "22" at right; "PRIVATE" centered at bottom	none	A-12345	Coded by horsepower class (A)	
	1922–23	Embossed white serial on dark blue plate with border line; "23" and vertical "ALA" at right; "PRIVATE" centered at bottom	none	A-12345	Coded by horsepower class (A)	
	1923–24	Embossed brown serial on cream plate with border line; "ALA. PRIVATE 1924" at bottom	none	A-123-456	Coded by horsepower class (A)	
	1924–25	Embossed white serial on red plate with border line; "1925 PRIVATE ALA." at bottom	none	A-123-456	Coded by horsepower class (A)	
	1925–26	Embossed white serial on green plate with border line; "1926 PRIVATE ALA." at bottom	none	A-123-456	Coded by horsepower class (A)	
	1926–27	Embossed white serial on black plate with border line; "ALABAMA 1927" at bottom	none	A-123-456	Coded by horsepower class (A)	First use of the full state name.
	1927–28	Embossed black serial on yellow plate with border line; "ALABAMA" at bottom, offset to left; "28" at bottom right	none	123-456A	Coded by horsepower class (A)	
	1928–29	Embossed yellow serial on black plate with border line; "ALABAMA" at bottom, offset to left; "29" at bottom right	none	123-456A	Coded by horsepower class (A)	
	1929–30	Embossed white serial on red plate with border line; "ALABAMA" at top, offset to left; "30" at top right	none	123-456A	Coded by horsepower class (A)	
	1930–31	Embossed yellow serial on green plate with border line; "ALABAMA" at top, offset to right; "31" at top left	none	A123-456	Coded by horsepower class (A)	
	1931–32	Embossed black serial on white plate with border line; "ALABAMA" at top, offset to left; "32" at top right	none	123-456A	Coded by horsepower class (A)	
	1932–33	Embossed white serial on light blue plate with border line; "ALABAMA" at bottom, offset to left; "33" at bottom right	none	123-456A	Coded by horsepower class (A)	
	1933–34	Embossed black serial on orange plate with border line; "ALABAMA" at top, offset to left; "34" at top right	none	123-456A	Coded by weight class (A)	
	1934–35	Embossed white serial on green plate with border line; "ALABAMA" at bottom, offset to left; "35" at bottom right	none	123-456A	Coded by weight class (A)	
	1935–36	Embossed red serial on white plate with border line; "ALABAMA" at top, offset to left; "36" at top right	none	123-456A	Coded by weight class (A)	
	1936–37	Embossed blue serial on white plate with border line; "ALA. FRONT" (on front plates) or "ALABAMA" (on rear plates) at bottom, offset to left; "37" at bottom right	none	123-456A	Coded by weight class (A)	Separate front and rear plates.
	1937–38	Embossed red serial on dark blue plate with border line; "ALABAMA" at top, offset to left; "38" at top right	none	123-456A	Coded by weight class (A)	
	1938–39	Embossed black serial on silver plate with border line; "ALABAMA" at bottom, offset to right; "39" at bottom left	none	A123-456	Coded by weight class (A)	
	1939–40	Embossed yellow serial on black plate with border line; "ALA." at top, offset to left; "40" at top right	none	123-456A	Coded by weight class (A)	
	1940–41	Embossed black serial on yellow plate with border line; "ALA. 1941" centered at top	none	A 123–456	Coded by weight class (A)	
	1941–43	Embossed yellow serial on black plate; "ALABAMA 1942" centered at bottom	none	1A12·345; 10A1·234	Coded by county of issuance (1 or 10) and weight class (A)	First use of county codes. Revalidated through September 30, 1943, with windshield stickers, due to metal conservation for World War II.
	1943–44	Embossed black serial on yellow plate; "ALABAMA 1944" centered at top	none	1A12·345; 10A1·234	Coded by county of issuance (1 or 10) and weight class (A)	
	1944–45	Embossed yellow serial on black plate; "ALABAMA 1945" centered at bottom	none	1A12·345; 10A1·234	Coded by county of issuance (1 or 10) and weight class (A)	
	1945–46	Embossed white serial on black plate; "ALABAMA 1946" centered at top	none	1A12·345; 10A1·234	Coded by county of issuance (1 or 10) and weight class (A)	
	1946–47	Embossed black serial on silver plate; "ALABAMA 1947" centered at bottom	none	1A12·345; 10A1·234	Coded by county of issuance (1 or 10) and weight class (A)	
	1947–48	Embossed golden yellow serial on black plate; "ALABAMA 1948" centered at top	none	1A12·345; 10A1·234	Coded by county of issuance (1 or 10) and weight class (A)	
	1948–49	Embossed black serial on golden yellow plate with border line; "ALA. 49" centered at bottom	none	1A12·345; 10A1·234	Coded by county of issuance (1 or 10) and weight class (A)	
	1949–50	Embossed yellow serial on black plate with border line; "ALA. 50" centered at top	none	1A12·345; 10A1·234	Coded by county of issuance (1 or 10) and weight class (A)	
	1950–51	Embossed black serial on yellow plate with border line; "ALA. 51" centered at bottom	none	1A12·345; 10A1·234	Coded by county of issuance (1 or 10) and weight class (A)	
	1951–52	Embossed white serial on blue plate with border line; "ALA. 52" centered at top	none	1A12·345; 10A1·234	Coded by county of issuance (1 or 10) and weight class (A)	
	1952–53	Embossed blue serial on white plate with border line; "ALA. 53" centered at bottom	none	1-123·456; 10-12·345	Coded by county of issuance (1 or 10)	
	1953–54	Embossed white serial on blue plate with border line; "ALA. 54" centered at bottom	none	1-123·456; 10-12·345	Coded by county of issuance (1 or 10)	
	1954–55	Embossed white serial on green plate with border line; heart shape around county code at left; "ALABAMA" centered at bottom; "55" at bottom right	"HEART OF DIXIE" centered at top	1 12·345; 1A 12·345; 10 12·345	Coded by county of issuance (1 or 10)	First use of the "Heart of Dixie" slogan. One-letter serial format used in Jefferson County after 1 99·999 was reached; this occurred on each subsequent plate until 1976, with Mobile County following suit from 1960.
	1955–56	Embossed black serial on golden yellow plate with border line; heart shape, "ALABAMA" and "56" at bottom	"HEART OF DIXIE" centered at top	1-12·345; 1A-12·345; 10-12·345	Coded by county of issuance (1 or 10)	First 6" x 12" plate.
	1956–57	Embossed golden yellow serial on black plate with border line; heart shape, "ALABAMA" and "57" at bottom	"HEART OF DIXIE" centered at top	1-12·345; 1A-12·345; 10-12·345	Coded by county of issuance (1 or 10)	
	1957–58	Embossed white serial on blue plate with border line; heart shape, "ALABAMA" and "58" at bottom	"HEART OF DIXIE" centered at top	1-12·345; 1A-12·345; 10-12·345	Coded by county of issuance (1 or 10)	
	1958–59	Embossed blue serial on white plate with border line; heart shape, "ALABAMA" and "59" at bottom	"HEART OF DIXIE" centered at top	1-12·345; 1A-12·345; 10-12·345	Coded by county of issuance (1 or 10)	
	1959–60	Embossed white serial on blue plate with border line; heart shape, "ALABAMA" and "60" at bottom	"HEART OF DIXIE" centered at top	1-12·345; 1A-12·345; 10-12·345	Coded by county of issuance (1 or 10)	
	1960–61	Embossed white serial on black plate with border line; heart shape, "ALABAMA" and "61" at bottom	"HEART OF DIXIE" centered at top	1-12·345; 1A-12·345; 10-12·345	Coded by county of issuance (1 or 10)	
	1961–62	Embossed white serial on green plate with border line; heart shape, "ALABAMA" and "62" at bottom	"HEART OF DIXIE" centered at top	1-12345; 1A-12345; 10-12345	Coded by county of issuance (1 or 10)	
	1962–63	Embossed reflective white serial on dark blue plate with border line; heart shape, "ALABAMA" and "63" at bottom	"HEART OF DIXIE" centered at top	1-12345; 1A-12345; 10-12345	Coded by county of issuance (1 or 10)	
	1963–64	Embossed reflective white serial on red plate with border line; heart shape, "ALABAMA" and "64" at bottom	"HEART OF DIXIE" centered at top	1-12345; 1A-12345; 10-12345	Coded by county of issuance (1 or 10)	Issued in the colors of the University of Alabama.
	1964–65	Embossed reflective orange serial on blue plate with border line; heart shape, "ALABAMA" and "65" at bottom	"HEART OF DIXIE" centered at top	1-12345; 1A-12345; 10-12345	Coded by county of issuance (1 or 10)	Issued in the colors of Auburn University.
	1965–66	Embossed reflective white serial on black plate with border line; heart shape, "ALABAMA" and "66" at bottom	"HEART OF DIXIE" centered at top	1-12345; 1A-12345; 10-12345	Coded by county of issuance (1 or 10)	
	1966–67	Embossed reflective yellow serial on blue plate with border line; heart shape, "ALABAMA" and "67" at bottom	"HEART OF DIXIE" centered at top	1-12345; 1A-12345; 10-12345	Coded by county of issuance (1 or 10)	
	1967–68	Embossed reflective white serial on red plate with border line; heart shape, "ALABAMA" and "68" at bottom	"HEART OF DIXIE" centered at top	1-12345; 1A-12345; 10-12345	Coded by county of issuance (1 or 10)	
	1968–69	Embossed green serial on reflective white plate with border line; heart shape, "ALABAMA" and "69" at bottom	"HEART OF DIXIE" centered at top	1-12345; 1A-12345; 10-12345	Coded by county of issuance (1 or 10)	
	1969–70	Embossed blue serial on reflective white plate with border line; heart shape, "ALABAMA" and "70" at bottom	"HEART OF DIXIE" centered at top	1-12345; 1A-12345; 10-12345	Coded by county of issuance (1 or 10)	
	1970–71	Embossed black serial on reflective yellow plate with border line; heart shape, "ALABAMA" and "71" at bottom	"HEART OF DIXIE" centered at top	1-12345; 1A-12345; 10-12345	Coded by county of issuance (1 or 10)	
	1971–72	Embossed black serial on reflective mint green plate with border line; heart shape, "ALABAMA" and "72" at bottom	"HEART OF DIXIE" centered at top	1-12345; 1A-12345; 10-12345	Coded by county of issuance (1 or 10)	
	1972–73	Embossed red serial on reflective white plate with border line; heart shape, "ALABAMA" and "73" at bottom	"HEART OF DIXIE" centered at top	1-12345; 1A-12345; 10-12345	Coded by county of issuance (1 or 10)	
	1973–74	Embossed black serial on reflective white plate with border line; "74", "ALABAMA" and heart shape at bottom	"HEART OF DIXIE" centered at top	1-12345; 1A-12345; 10-12345	Coded by county of issuance (1 or 10)	
	1974–75	Embossed black serial on reflective yellow plate with border line; heart shape, "ALABAMA" and "75" at bottom	"HEART OF DIXIE" centered at top	1-12345; 1A-12345; 10-12345	Coded by county of issuance (1 or 10)	
	1975–76	Embossed blue serial on reflective white plate with border line; "76", "ALABAMA" and heart shape at bottom	"HEART OF DIXIE" centered at top	1-12345; 1A-12345; 10-12345	Coded by county of issuance (1 or 10)	

=== 1976 to present ===
Image	Dates issued	Design	Slogan	Serial format	Serials issued	Notes
	October 1976 – December 1981	Embossed blue serial on reflective white plate; red Alabama State Capitol graphic screened in the center; state flag, blue rectangle and U.S. Bicentennial logo screened at bottom; "ALABAMA" screened in blue centered at top	"HEART OF DIXIE" in white within red heart screened at top left	ABC 123	AAA 001 to approximately HDZ 999	Early plates carried the county of issuance on a sticker over the blue rectangle. Later plates used taller serial dies. Letters I and Q not used in serials.
	January 1982 – December 1986	Embossed red serial on reflective white plate; "Alabama" screened in dark blue centered at top	"HEART OF DIXIE" in white within dark blue heart screened at top left	1A 12345; 10A 1234; 47 12345	Coded by county of issuance (1 or 10)	All-numeric serials issued in Madison County after 47Z 9999 was reached.
	January 1987 – December 1991	Embossed blue serial on reflective white plate; two red hearts screened at top left and top right, connected by two red lines; "Alabama" screened in red centered at bottom	"HEART OF DIXIE" screened in red centered at top, between red lines	1AB 1234; 10AB 123	Coded by county of issuance (1 or 10)	
	January 1992 – December 1996	Embossed blue serial on reflective white plate; "ALABAMA" screened in blue centered at top, with blue line on either side	"Heart of Dixie" screened in red centered between state name and serial, with heart outline around the "of"	1ABC123; 10ABC12	Coded by county of issuance (1 or 10)	Letters E, I, O, Q, U and X not used in serials; this practice continued until 2022.
	January 1997 – December 2001	Embossed black serial on reflective white plate; pale blue fade with stars at top and pale red fade at bottom; "Alabama" screened in red at bottom	"Heart of Dixie" screened in blue centered at top; with red heart behind the "of"	1AB1234; 10AB123; 47ABC12; 47A1B23	Coded by county of issuance (1 or 10)	Three-letter and letter-number-letter serial formats used in Madison County after 47ZZ999 was reached.
	January 2002 – December 31, 2008	Embossed red serial on reflective white plate; blue bar with white falling stars and musical notes screened at top; "Alabama" screened in red centered at bottom	"Stars Fell On" screened in white centered on blue bar; "HEART OF DIXIE" in white within red heart screened above and to right of state name	1A1234B; 10A123B; 47A1B2C	Coded by county of issuance (1 or 10)	Alternating letter-number serial format used in Madison County after 47Z999Z was reached. Plates with screened serials issued in counties that had exhausted their supplies of embossed plates.
	June – December 31, 2008	As above, but with serial screened rather than embossed	"Stars Fell On" screened in white centered on blue bar; "HEART OF DIXIE" in white within red heart screened above and to right of state name	1A1234B; 10A123B; 47A1B2C	Coded by county of issuance (1 or 10)	Alternating letter-number serial format used in Madison County after 47Z999Z was reached. Plates with screened serials issued in counties that had exhausted their supplies of embossed plates.
	January 2, 2009 – December 31, 2013	Black screened digits with Alabama Gulf Coast graphic; blue cursive "Alabama" centered at bottom	"Sweet Home" in blue centered at top; "HEART OF DIXIE" in blue within blue heart outline to right of "Sweet Home"	1A12B34; 10A12B3	Coded by county of issuance (1 or 10)	
	January 2, 2014 – January 2, 2022	Black screened serial with lake and forest graphic	"HEART OF DIXIE" in white within white heart outline at bottom right	1AB1234; 10AB123; 10A1B23	Coded by county of issuance (1 or 10)	Letter-number-letter serial format used in Madison and Shelby Counties after 47ZZ999 and 58ZZ999, respectively, were reached.
	January 3, 2022 – present	Black screened serial with sunrise beach graphic; "ALABAMA" centered at top in blue; "www.alabama.travel" centered at bottom in white	"HEART OF DIXIE" in white within white heart outline at bottom right	1A2345B; 1A23BCD; 10A123B; 10A12B3; 10A1B23; 10A1BC2; 10A2BCD; 10ABCDE	Coded by county of issuance (1 or 10)	While the official start of this base was January 2022, some appeared as early as October 2021. The last 4-5 characters can be numbers or letters. Each progresses 0 to 9, then A to Y, from right to left. Letters I, O, Q not used. Additionally, the letters F, G, J, K, L, S, V and Z have only been observed in the 10A123B format.

== Non-passenger and specialty plates ==
Alabama offers a variety of optional plates that motorists may display upon the payment of an additional fee as well as non-passenger plate types that are displayed on vehicles for specialized uses.

=== Non-passenger types ===
Many non-passenger types are both county-coded and weight-coded. Where noted, the county code is the first one or two regularly sized number of the serial, while the weight code is a small number beneath the letter that indicates the vehicle type.

Image	Type	First issued (in design shown)	Serial format	Notes
	Ambulance/Hearse	October 1, 2022	0K/0 12345; 00K/0 1234	Annual plates. "Ambulance" legend.
	Apportioned	January 2012	1234567	Annual plates. "Apportioned" legend.
	Bus	October 2013	0Q/0 12345; 00Q/0 1234	Annual plates. "Bus" legend.
	Consular Official	October 1, 2022	CNSL12	Annual plates. "Consular Official" legend.
	Cotton Module	October 2013	CM12345	Annual plates. "Cotton Module" legend.
	County Government - Motorcycle	Unknown	CM 123	Permanent plates.
	County Government - Passenger	Unknown	12345 CO	"County" legend. Permanent plates.
	County Government - Passenger - Disabled	Unknown	D12 CO	"County" legend. Permanent plates.
	Dealer - Motorcycle	Unknown	1234	Annual plates. "Dealer" legend.
	Dealer - Passenger	Unknown	12345	Annual plates. "Dealer" legend.
	Dealer Transit - Motorcycle		12345	Annual plates. "Dealer" legend.
	Dealer Transit - Passenger		12345	Annual plates. "Dealer" legend.
	Disabled Person - Motorcycle		12G34	
	Disabled Person - Passenger		123 AB; 1A2B3	
	Farm Truck or Farm Truck Tractor	Unknown	0F/0 12345; 00F/0 1234	Annual plates. "Farm" legend.
	Fleet	Unknown		"Fleet" legend.
	For-Hire - Limited		0X/L 12345; 00X/L 1234	Annual plates.
	Forest Truck	Unknown	0L/0 12345; 00L/0 1234	Annual plates. "Forest" legend.
	Manufacturer	Unknown	MA1234	Annual plates. "Manufacturer" legend.
	Motorcycle	January 2014	123456M	
	Municipal Government - Motorcycle		MM 123	Permanent plates.
	Municipal Government - Passenger		12345 MU	"Municipal" legend. Permanent plates.
	Municipal Government - Passenger - Disabled		A12 MU	"Municipal" legend. Permanent plates.
	Municipal Government - Public Utility		1234 PUD	"Municipal" legend. Permanent plates.
	Permanent Trailer		A123456	Permanent plates.
	Motor Home		0R/0 12345; 00R/0 1234	Annual plates. Weight class as legend.
	Rental Trailer		0R/T 12345; 00R/T 1234	Annual plates.
	Taxi		0Z/0 12345; 00Z/0 1234	Annual plates.
	Semi Trailer		0TR 1234; 00T/R 1234	Annual plates. "Forest" legend.
	State Defense Force		123SDF	
	State Government - Motorcycle		S M12	Permanent plates.
	State Government - Passenger		S 1234A	Permanent plates.
	State Government - Passenger - Disabled		S 12A	Permanent plates.
	State Government - Passenger - State motor pool		SMP 123	Permanent plates.
	Truck or Truck Tractor - 8,001 to 10,000 lb.		0P/0 12345; 00P/0 1234	
	Truck or Truck Tractor - greater than 10,000 lb.		0X/0 12345; 00X/0 1234	Annual plates.
	U.S. Government-Loaned		GL 1234	"US GOV'T LOANED" legend. Permanent plates.
	Vintage Vehicle - Motorcycle			
	Vintage Vehicle - Passenger		VAB 123	
	Volunteer Fire Department		VF1234	

=== Specialty types ===
Image	Type	First issued	Serial format	Notes
	Active Reserve	Redesigned 2009	12AB	
	Alabama A&M University			Available in personalized format.
	Alabama Cattlemen's Association		1A23B	Available in personalized format.
	Alabama Children's Trust Fund			Available in personalized format.
	Alabama State University		ABC123	Available in personalized format.
	Alabama Wildlife Federation		1A23B	Available in personalized format.
	Amateur Radio		various	
	Athens State University			Available in personalized format.
	Atomic Nuked Veteran		A12B3	
	Atomic Nuked Veteran - Disabled		A12B	
	Auburn University		12A3B	Available in personalized format.
	Barber Vintage Motorsports Museum - Motorcycle			Available in personalized format.
	Barber Vintage Motorsports Museum - Passenger			Available in personalized format.
	Birmingham-Southern College			Available in personalized format.
	Breast Cancer Research Foundation of Alabama	2009		Available in personalized format.
	Choose Life		1A23B	
	Curing Childhood Cancer		12A3B	Available in personalized format.
	Desert Shield/Desert Storm Veteran		A12B3	
	Desert Shield/Desert Storm Veteran - Disabled		A12B	
	Disabled Veteran		V12345	Sticker with name of conflict placed between lower bolt holes.
	Disabled Veteran - Disabled		AB12	Sticker with name of conflict placed between lower bolt holes.
	Drive Out Ovarian Cancer	2009		Available in personalized format.
	Ducks Unlimited		ABC123	Available in personalized format.
	Educator	Redesigned 2009	AB123	Available in personalized format.
	Faulkner University	Redesigned 2009		Available in personalized format.
	Farming Feeds Alabama		ABC123	Available in personalized format.
	Fight Breast Cancer	2009		Available in personalized format.
	Fire Fighter		F12345	
	First to the Moon and Beyond		ABC123	Serials were initially embossed but were later surface-printed. Available in personalized format.
	Forests Forever		ABC123	Available in personalized format.
	Forever Wild		1234FW	Available in personalized format.
	Former Prisoner of War		POW 1234	"God Bless America" legend
	Former Prisoner of War		POW 1AB	"God Bless America" legend
	Fraternal Order of Police		123FA; 12AB3	
	Generic specialty plate: Alabama Association of Realtors; Civitan International; Delta Sigma Theta; Letter Carrier; NASCAR-themed; Organ Donor; Retired Educator; Square Dancer; Take a Kid Fishing		12A3B; 1A2B3	Decal promoting organization or cause applied to left of serial. Available in personalized format.
	Global War on Terrorism Veteran		12A3B	
	Global War on Terrorism Veteran - Disabled			
	God Bless America	2006 redesigned 2013	AB12345 and 12345AB 1234AB5	
	Helping Schools		HS123A	Available in personalized format.
	Helping Uninsured Children	c. 2008		Available in personalized format.
	Huntingdon College		1A23B	Available in personalized format.
	Jacksonville State University			Available in personalized format.
	Judson College			Available in personalized format.
	Korean War Veteran		A12B3	
	Korean War Veteran - Disabled		A12B	
	Medal of Honor		MOH 1	
	Medal of Honor - Disabled		1AB	
	Miles College			Available in personalized format.
	National Guard	Redesigned 2008	12345 (until 2008); N/G (2008—present)	
	National Guard - Disabled		1AB (until 2008) unknown (2008—present)	
	National Wild Turkey Federation			Available in personalized format.
	Oakwood College		1A23B	Available in personalized format.
	Pearl Harbor Survivor		1A2	
	Pearl Harbor Survivor - Disabled		AB1	
	Protect Our Environment		ABC123	Available in personalized format.
	Purple Heart	Redesigned c. 2009	PH12A	"Combat Wounded" legend
	Purple Heart—Disabled	Redesigned c. 2009	AB1	"Combat Wounded" legend
	Rescue Squad	Redesigned 2009	RS 12345	
	Samford University	Redesigned 2009	SU12A	Available in personalized format.
	Save the Cahaba			Available in personalized format.
	Selma University		1A23B	Available in personalized format.
	Shriners Hospitals for Children		AB 12	
	Sons of Confederate Veterans		AB123	Available in personalized format.
	Spay and Neuter	2009		Available in personalized format.
	Spring Hill College		SHC123	Available in personalized format.
	Stillman College		123 SC	Available in personalized format.
	Support the Arts			Available in personalized format.
	Talladega College		12 TC; 123 TC	
	Tuskegee University		T123U	
	Troy University			Available in personalized format.
	University of Alabama	Redesigned c. 2004, 2009	ABC123	Serials were initially embossed but were later surface-printed. Available in personalized format.
	University of Alabama Birmingham		A1B23	Available in personalized format.
	University of Alabama in Huntsville			Available in personalized format.
	University of Mobile		A1B23	Available in personalized format.
	University of Montevallo	Redesigned c. 2008	A123B	Available in personalized format.
	University of North Alabama	Redesigned c. 2009	UNA123	Available in personalized format.
	University of South Alabama	Redesigned c. 2009	SA123	Available in personalized format.
	University of West Alabama	Redesigned c. 2009	123WA	Available in personalized format.
	U.S. Armed Forces - Retired		A1B23	Sticker with branch of service placed between lower bolt holes.
	U.S. Armed Forces - Retired - Disabled		1234A	Sticker with branch of service placed between lower bolt holes.
	Vanity		various	
	Vietnam Veteran		A12B3	
	Vietnam Veteran - Disabled		A12B3	
	World War II Veteran - American Campaign		A12B3	
	World War II Veteran - American Campaign - Disabled		A12B	
	World War II Veteran - Asiatic Campaign		A12B3	
	World War II Veteran - Asiatic Campaign - Disabled		A12B	
	World War II Veteran - Battle of the Bulge		A12B3	
	World War II Veteran - Battle of the Bulge - Disabled		A12B	
	World War II Veteran - European Campaign		A12B3	
	World War II Veteran - European Campaign		A12B	

== County coding ==
Alabama established a numerical county-code system for its license plates in 1941, with codes 1, 2 and 3 assigned to the three most populous counties of the time (Jefferson, Mobile and Montgomery), and codes 4 through 67 assigned to the remaining counties in alphabetical order. The state had no plans to update this numbering system. Code 70 was added in 1948 for replacement plates, followed in 1966 by code 80 for supplemental plates in counties that had run out of standard plates. The system remains in use today on passenger plates and some non-passenger types. Despite being 03 on registration plates, Montgomery County is no longer the third most populous county and ranks 7th in the state. The current second Most populous county as of 2024 is Madison County with the registration code of 47.

Code	County
1	Jefferson
2	Mobile
3	Montgomery
4	Autauga
5	Baldwin
6	Barbour
7	Bibb
8	Blount
9	Bullock
10	Butler
11	Calhoun
12	Chambers
13	Cherokee
14	Chilton
15	Choctaw
16	Clarke
17	Clay
18	Cleburne
19	Coffee
20	Colbert
21	Conecuh
22	Coosa
23	Covington
24	Crenshaw
25	Cullman
26	Dale
27	Dallas
28	DeKalb
29	Elmore
30	Escambia
31	Etowah
32	Fayette
33	Franklin
34	Geneva
35	Greene
36	Hale
37	Henry
38	Houston
39	Jackson
40	Lamar
41	Lauderdale
42	Lawrence
43	Lee
44	Limestone
45	Lowndes
46	Macon
47	Madison
48	Marengo
49	Marion
50	Marshall
51	Monroe
52	Morgan
53	Perry
54	Pickens
55	Pike
56	Randolph
57	Russell
58	Shelby
59	St. Clair
60	Sumter
61	Talladega
62	Tallapoosa
63	Tuscaloosa
64	Walker
65	Washington
66	Wilcox
67	Winston
70	Replacement
80	Supplemental
