= Vehicle registration plates of Mississippi =

Mississippi vehicle license plates

Mississippi
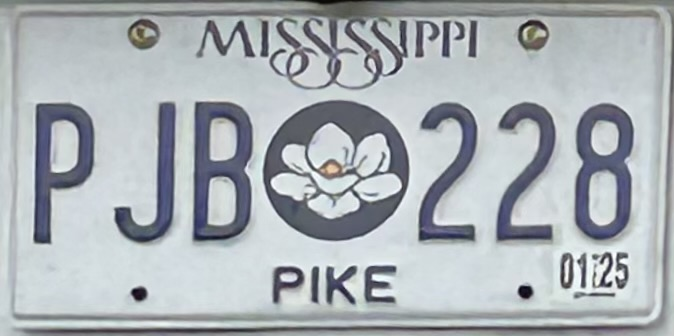

Current series
- Size: 12 in × 6 in 30 cm × 15 cm
- Material: Aluminum
- Serial format: ABC 123 (county-coded)
- Introduced: January 1, 2024

Availability
- Issued by: Mississippi Department of Revenue, Vehicle Licensing Division
- Manufactured by: Waldale Manufacturing Limited, Amherst, Nova Scotia

History
- First issued: June 1, 1912

The U.S. state of Mississippi first required its residents to register their motor vehicles and display license plates in 1912. Since then, the state has gone through a variety of license plate designs and currently has several different designs for passenger, non-passenger, and optional-issue plates.

As of 2026, plates are issued by the Mississippi Department of Revenue through its Vehicle Licensing Division. Only rear plates have been required since 1925.

== Passenger baseplates ==
=== 1912 to 1976 ===
In 1956, the United States, Canada, and Mexico came to an agreement with the American Association of Motor Vehicle Administrators, the Automobile Manufacturers Association and the National Safety Council that standardized the size for license plates for vehicles (except those for motorcycles) at 6 inches (15 cm) in height by 12 inches (30 cm) in width, with standardized mounting holes. The first Mississippi license plate that complied with these standards was issued 22 years beforehand, in 1934.

Image	Dates issued	Design	Serial format	Serials issued	Notes
	1912	Embossed black on white; vertical "1912" and "MISS" at left and right respectively	1234		First state issue. Local municipalities had issued license plates earlier.
	1913	As 1912 base, but with "1913" at right	1234		One of the rarest license plates in American history. Only two plates are known to exist.
	1914–18	Embossed black on white; vertical "MISS" at right	12345	1 to approximately 44500	
	1919	Embossed light green on black; vertical "1919" and "MISS" at left and right respectively	12345	1 to approximately 60000	
	1920	Embossed white on maroon with border line; vertical "1920" and "MISS" at left and right respectively	12345	1 to approximately 65000	
	1921	Embossed red on white with border line; vertical "1921" and "MISS" at left and right respectively	12345	1 to approximately 64500	
	1922	Embossed black on light green with border line; vertical "1922" and "MISS" at left and right respectively	12345	1 to approximately 77000	
	1923	Embossed yellow on black with border line; vertical "1923" and "MISS" at left and right respectively	123456	1 to approximately 107000	
	1924	Embossed white on dark blue with border line; vertical "1924" and "MISS" at left and right respectively	123456	1 to approximately 133000	
	1925	Embossed black on golden yellow with border line; vertical "1925" and "MISS" at left and right respectively	123-456	1 to approximately 177-000	
	1926	Embossed white on dark green with border line; vertical "1926" and "MISS" at left and right respectively	123-456	1 to approximately 207-000	
	1927	Embossed yellow on navy blue with border line; "MISS. 1927" centered at bottom	123-456	1 to approximately 235-000	
	1928	Embossed white on black with border line; "MISS. 1928" centered at bottom	123-456	1 to approximately 249-000	
	1929	Embossed white on maroon with border line; "MISS-1929" centered at bottom	123-456	1 to approximately 279-000	
	1930	Embossed red on dark blue with border line; "MISS-1930" centered at bottom	123-456	1 to approximately 283-000	
	1931	Embossed white on orange with border line; "MISS 1931" centered at bottom	123-456	1 to approximately 245-000	
	1932	Embossed golden yellow on black with border line; "MISS-1932" centered at bottom	123-456	1 to approximately 221-000	
	1933	Embossed white on dark green with border line; "MISS." centered at top; tax code letter and "33" stamped on locking bar, displayed to left and right of state abbreviation respectively	123-456	1 to approximately 120-000	
	1934	Embossed white on black with border line; "MISS." centered at top; tax code letter and "34" stamped on locking bar, displayed to left and right of state abbreviation respectively	123-456	1 to approximately 149-000	
	1935	Embossed orange on black with border line; "MISS." centered at top; "35" and tax code letter stamped on locking bar, displayed to left and right of state abbreviation respectively	123-456	1 to approximately 152-000	
	1936	Embossed white on black with border line; "MISS." centered at top; tax code letter and "36" stamped on locking bar, displayed to left and right of state abbreviation respectively	123-456	1 to approximately 164-000	
	1937	Embossed white on green with border line; "MISS." centered at top; tax code letter at top left and "37" at top right	123-456	1 to approximately 170-000	
	1938	Embossed white on dark blue with border line; "MISS." centered at top; tax code letter at top left and "38" at top right	123-456	300-001 to approximately 491-000	Issued only from January 1 through October 31, 1938.
	1938–39	Embossed black on yellow with border line; "MISS." centered at top; "19" at top left and "39" at top right	123-456	300-001 to approximately 506-000	
	1939–40	Embossed yellow on black with border line; "MISS." centered at top; "19" at top left and "40" at top right	123-456	700-001 to approximately 892-000	
	1940–41	Embossed white on black with border line; vertical "MISS" used as separator; county name and "EX. 10-31-41" at top	123-456	100-001 to approximately 318-000	First to use county name
	1941–42	Embossed yellow on dark blue with border line; vertical "MISS" used as separator; county name and "EX. 10-31-42" at top	123-456	400-001 to approximately 643-000	
	1942–43	Embossed orange on black with border line; vertical "MISS" used as separator; county name and "EX. 10-31-43" at top	123-456	600-001 to approximately 815-000	Due to wartime metal shortages, some 1943 plates were over-stamped on previously used license plates, and the old embossed letters and numbers are still partially visible under the new paint.
	1943–44	Embossed white on black with border line; vertical "MISS" used as separator; county name and "EX. 10-31-44" at top	123-456	700-001 to approximately 898-000	Due to wartime metal shortages, some 1944 plates were over-stamped on previously used license plates, and the old embossed letters and numbers are still partially visible under the new paint.
	1944–45	Embossed yellow on black with border line; vertical "MISS" used as separator; county name and "EX. 10-31-45" at top	123-456	500-001 to approximately 700-000	Due to wartime metal shortages, some 1945 plates were over-stamped on previously used license plates, and the old embossed letters and numbers are still partially visible under the new paint.
	1945–46	Embossed white on black with border line; vertical "MISS" used as separator; county name and "EX. 10-31-46" at top	123-456	200-001 to approximately 411-000	
	1946–47	Embossed yellow on black with border line; vertical "MISS" used as separator; county name and "EX. 10-31-47" at top	123-456	500-001 to approximately 735-000	
	1947–48	Embossed white on black with border line; vertical "MISS" used as separator; county name and "EX. 10-31-48" at top	123-456	Issued in blocks by county	
	1948–49	Embossed orange on black with border line; vertical "MISS" used as separator; county name and "EX. 10-31-49" at top	123-456	Issued in blocks by county	
	1949–50	Embossed black on yellow with border line; vertical "MISS" used as separator; county name and "EX. 10-31-50" at top	123-456	Issued in blocks by county	
	1950–51	Embossed yellow on black with border line; "MISSISSIPPI" and county name centered at top and bottom respectively	123-456	Issued in blocks by county	First use of the full state name.
	1951–52	Embossed white on dark green with border line; "MISSISSIPPI" and county name centered at top and bottom respectively	123-456	Issued in blocks by county	
	1952–53	Embossed maroon on white with border line; "MISSISSIPPI" and county name centered at top and bottom respectively	123-456	Issued in blocks by county	
	1953–54	Embossed white on black with border line; "MISSISSIPPI" and county name centered at top and bottom respectively	123-456	Issued in blocks by county	
	1954–55	Embossed white on blue with border line; "MISSISSIPPI" and county name centered at top and bottom respectively	123-456	Issued in blocks by county	
	1955–56	Embossed yellow on black with border line; "MISSISSIPPI" and county name centered at top and bottom respectively	123-456	Issued in blocks by county	
	1956–57	Embossed white on dark green with border line; "MISSISSIPPI" and county name centered at top and bottom respectively	123-456	Issued in blocks by county	
	1957–58	Embossed black on golden yellow with border line; "MISSISSIPPI" and county name centered at top and bottom respectively	123-456	Issued in blocks by county	
	1958–59	Embossed dark green on white with border line; "MISSISSIPPI" and county name centered at top and bottom respectively	123-456	Issued in blocks by county	
	1959–60	Embossed red on white with border line; "MISSISSIPPI" and county name centered at top and bottom respectively	123-456	Issued in blocks by county	
	1960–61	Embossed black on white with border line; "MISSISSIPPI" and county name centered at top and bottom respectively	123-456	Issued in blocks by county	
	1961–62	Embossed maroon on white with border line; "MISSISSIPPI" and county name centered at top and bottom respectively	A/1 12345; A/10 12345	Coded by county of issuance (1 or 10) and weight class (A)	Weight classes were as follows: A (1,800 lb and under), B (1,801 to 3,000 lb), C (3,001 to 4,000 lb) and D (4,001 lb and over).
	1962–63	Embossed blue on white with border line; "MISSISSIPPI" and county name centered at top and bottom respectively	1A-1234; 10A-123; XA-1234; 1-1234; 10-1234; X-12345	Coded by county of issuance (1, 10 or X) and weight class (A)	Letter county codes used by the 17 most populous counties that used two-digit codes in 1961–62. No letter used for the 3,001 to 4,000 lb weight class. Both these practices continued through September 1968.
	1963–64	Embossed red on white with border line; "MISSISSIPPI" and county name centered at top and bottom respectively	1A-1234; 10A-123; XA-1234; 1-1234; 10-1234; X-12345	Coded by county of issuance (1, 10 or X) and weight class (A)	
	1964–65	Embossed white on blue with border line; "MISSISSIPPI" and county name centered at top and bottom respectively	1A-1234; 10A-123; XA-1234; 1-1234; 10-1234; X-12345	Coded by county of issuance (1, 10 or X) and weight class (A)	
	1965–66	Embossed blue on white with border line; "MISSISSIPPI" and county name centered at top and bottom respectively	1A-1234; 10A-123; XA-1234; 1-12345; 10-1234; X-12345	Coded by county of issuance (1, 10 or X) and weight class (A)	
	1966–67	Embossed white on black with border line; "MISSISSIPPI" and county name centered at top and bottom respectively	1A-1234; 10A-123; XA-1234; 1-12345; 10-1234; X-12345	Coded by county of issuance (1, 10 or X) and weight class (A)	
	1967–68	Embossed black on beige with border line; "MISSISSIPPI" and county name centered at top and bottom respectively	1A-1234; 10A-123; XA-1234; 1-12345; 10-1234; X-12345	Coded by county of issuance (1, 10 or X) and weight class (A)	
	1968–69	Embossed white on brown with border line; "MISSISSIPPI" and county name centered at top and bottom respectively	1A 12345; 10A12345	Coded by county of issuance (1 or 10) and weight class (A)	All county codes and weight class letters same as 1961–62.
	1969–70	Embossed blue on white with border line; "MISSISSIPPI" and county name centered at top and bottom respectively	1A 12345; 10A12345	Coded by county of issuance (1 or 10) and weight class (A)	
	1970–71	Embossed green on white with border line; "MISSISSIPPI" and county name centered at top and bottom respectively	1A 12345; 10A12345	Coded by county of issuance (1 or 10) and weight class (A)	
	1971–72	Embossed green on reflective white with border line; "MISSISSIPPI" and county name centered at top and bottom respectively	1A 12345; 10A12345	Coded by county of issuance (1 or 10) and weight class (A)	
	1972–73	Embossed red on reflective white with border line; "MISSISSIPPI" and county name centered at top and bottom respectively	1A 12345; 10A12345	Coded by county of issuance (1 or 10) and weight class (A)	
	1973–74	Embossed blue on reflective white with border line; "MISSISSIPPI" and county name centered at top and bottom respectively	ABC 123; 123 ABC	Coded by weight class (A)	Letters I, O and Q not used in serials. The 123 ABC format was used in the five most populous counties (Hinds, Harrison, Jackson, Washington and Lauderdale); this practice continued until the cessation of weight classes in 1976.
	1974–75	Embossed red on reflective white with border line; "MISSISSIPPI" and county name centered at top and bottom respectively	ABC 123; 123 ABC	Coded by weight class (A)	
	1975–76	Embossed maroon on reflective white with border line; "MISSISSIPPI" and county name centered at top and bottom respectively	ABC 123; 123 ABC	Coded by weight class (A)	

=== 1976 to present ===
Image	Dates issued	Design	Slogan	Serial format	Serials issued	Notes
	October 1, 1976 – September 30, 1981	Embossed red serial on reflective white plate with border line; green magnolia graphic screened in the center; "MISSISSIPPI" screened in green centered at top; county name embossed in red centered at bottom	The Hospitality State	ABC 123	Issued in blocks by county	First graphic plate; monthly staggered registration also introduced. Awarded "Plate of the Year" for best new license plate of 1977 by the Automobile License Plate Collectors Association, the first time Mississippi was so honored. Some plates had the magnolia graphic in a darker shade of green.
	October 1, 1981 – September 30, 1987	Embossed dark blue serial on reflective white plate; "MISSISSIPPI" screened in red centered at top; county name embossed in dark blue centered at bottom	none	ABC 123	Issued in blocks by county	Wide serial dies.
	October 1, 1987 – September 30, 1992	Embossed dark blue serial on reflective white plate; "MISSISSIPPI" screened in red centered at top; county name embossed in dark blue centered at bottom	none	1ABC123	1AAA001 to approximately 1FNJ999	Narrow serial dies reintroduced. The initial '1' indicated the passenger class of vehicles. Letters I, O, Q and U and number 666 not used in serials; this practice continued through September 1997.
	October 1, 1992 – September 30, 1997	Embossed dark blue serial on reflective gradient sky blue and white plate; "MISSISSIPPI" screened in blue centered at top; county name embossed in dark blue centered at bottom	none	ABC 123	Issued in blocks by county	Awarded "Plate of the Year" for best new license plate of 1992 by the Automobile License Plate Collectors Association, the second time Mississippi was so honored.
	October 1, 1997 – September 30, 2002	Embossed dark green serial on reflective gradient yellow, white and green plate; magnolia graphic screened in the center; "MISSISSIPPI" screened in dark green centered at top; county name embossed in dark green centered at bottom	none	ABC 123	Issued in blocks by county	Letters I, O, Q and U not used in serials, but number 666 used.
	October 1, 2002 – September 30, 2007	Embossed dark green serial on reflective graphic plate with green trees at top, magnolia in the center and blue bands at bottom representing water; "MISSISSIPPI" screened in dark green centered at top; county name embossed in dark green centered at bottom	none	123 ABC	Issued in blocks by county	Letter O and number 666 not used in serials; this practice continues today.
	October 1, 2007 – September 30, 2012	Featuring an image of the Biloxi Lighthouse at the center of the plate, on a multicolored background depicting a yellow sunrise behind the lighthouse.	none	ABC 123	Issued in blocks by county	Awarded "Plate of the Year" for best new license plate of 2007 by the Automobile License Plate Collectors Association, the third time Mississippi was so honored.
	October 1, 2012 – January 2018	Featuring an image of B.B. King's Lucille guitar, white background with blue lines from the bottom of the plate. State name printed at the top in blue, county name stamped at the bottom	Birthplace of America's Music / Celebrating Mississippi's Creative Culture	ABC 123	Issued in blocks by county	
	2018 – January 2019	Featuring an image of B.B. King's Lucille guitar, white background with blue lines from the bottom of the plate. State name printed at the top in blue, county name stamped at the bottom	Birthplace of America's Music / Celebrating Mississippi's Creative Culture	ABC 1234	Issued in blocks by county	
	January 2019 – December 2023	Embossed dark blue serial on gold gradient plate; screened state seal slightly to left of center; state name screened in dark blue centered at top; county name embossed in dark blue centered at bottom	none	ABC 1234	Issued in blocks by county	Controversy and lawsuit over "In God We Trust" (added to seal in 2014, also added to state flag in 2021)
	January 2024 – present	Embossed dark blue serial on white plate; screened magnolia blossom against a blue circle acting as separator; state name screened in dark blue centered at top; county name embossed in dark blue centered at bottom	none	ABC 123	Issued in blocks by county	Created by Leah Eaton of Starkville, Mississippi.

== County coding ==
County	Letter blocks beginning with					
County	1976–87	1992–97	1997–2002	2002–07	2007–18	2018–present
Adams	AA, AB	AA, AB	WN	AD, AE	AD, AE	AD
Alcorn	AH–AJ	AG, AH, AJ	WG, WJ	AN, AP	AL, AC	AC
Amite	AM	AM, AN	WD	AM	AM	AM
Attala	AT	AT	WA, WB	AT	AT, AA	AA
Benton	BA	BA	VY	BE	BE	BE
Bolivar	BD, BE	BD, BF, BG	VS	BL, BM	BR, BV (Cleveland); BL (Rosedale)	BL
Calhoun	BL	BL	VN	CA	CA, CN	CA
Carroll	BP, BT	BP, BS	VK, VL	CR	CR	CR
Chickasaw	BV, BX	BV, BX	VH	CH	CH	CH
Choctaw	CA	BZ	VB	CT	CT	CT
Claiborne	CC	CB	TZ	CL	CB	CB
Clarke	CE	CD	TV, TW	CK	CK, CL	CE
Clay	CH	CG	TM, TN	CY	CY	CY
Coahoma	CK, CL	CL, CM	TG	CM	CM	CG
Copiah	CR, CS	CS, CT	SY	CP	CP, CQ	CF
Covington	CX	CX	SV	CV	CV, CW	CV
DeSoto	DA–DD	DA–DF	SG, SJ–SP	DA–DZ	DA–DZ	DA, DC
Forrest	DK–DN	DK–DM	RY–SA, SC	FM, FS, FT	FR–FT	FR
Franklin	DX	DW	RW	FR	FN	FN
George	EA	DY	RR	GE	GE, GF	GE
Greene	EE	EB	RM	GR	GR	GR
Grenada	EG, EH	ED	RJ, RK	GN	GN, GA	GA
Hancock	EX, EY	EH, EJ	RC, RD	HA, HB	KA–KD	KA
Harrison	FA–FI (Gulfport); FN–FS (Biloxi)	EL–ET (Gulfport); FB–FD (Biloxi)	PD–PR, PV, PX	HR–HZ	HA–HH (Gulfport); HI–HK (Biloxi)	HA–HB
Hinds	GA–GL (Jackson); HM–HN (Raymond)	FP–FX (Jackson); HA–HC (Raymond)	NH–NK, NP–NV	HC, HF–HK, HN	HN–HW (Jackson); HX–HZ (Raymond)	HN–HP
Holmes	HR	HF	NB	HL	HL	HL
Humphreys	HW	HJ	MZ	HM	HM	HM
Issaquena	IA	HL	MX	IS	IS	IR
Itawamba	IT, IV	HN, HP	MM, MP	IT	IT, IW	IT
Jackson	JA–JG	HS–HZ	LW–LZ, MG, MJ	JG–JM	JG–JM	JG
Jasper	JR–JT, JV	JL, JN	LV	JS	JA (Paulding); JB (Bay Springs)	JA
Jefferson	JW	JR	LP	JF	JF	JE
Jefferson Davis	JY, JZ	JT	LM	JD	JD	JC
Jones	KA–KE	JW, JZ, KA	LC, LD, LJ	JN, JP	JN (Ellisville); JP–JR (Laurel)	JN
Kemper	KJ	KE	LA	KM	KM	KM
Lafayette	KL, KM	KG, KH	KW, KX	LX–LZ	LX–LZ	LX
Lamar	KP, KR	KL, KM	KP, KR	LL, LM	LL–LN	LL
Lauderdale	KV–KZ	KR–KV	KG–KK	LA–LD	LA–LD	LA
Lawrence	LH	LE	KE	LW	LW	LW
Leake	LJ, LK	LG	KB	LK	LJ, LK	LJ
Lee	LM–LR	LK–LP	JT, JV–JY	LE-LH	LE-LH	LE
Leflore	LX–LZ	MA, MB	JN, JP	LR	LR, LS	LR
Lincoln	MD–MF	MF, MG	JH, JJ	LI, LJ	LI, LP, LQ	LI
Lowndes	MJ–MM	ML–MP	JA, JB, JD, JE	LN, LP, LQ	LT–LV	LT
Madison	MR–MT, MV	MV, MW, MY	HM, HN, HV, HW	MA-MD	MA-MF	MA
Marion	MY, MZ	NC, ND	HJ, HK	MN	MN, MP	MM
Marshall	NC, ND	NF–NH	HE–HG	MR, MS	MQ–MS	MH
Monroe	NG–NI	NK, NL	GZ, HA	MF	MJ–ML	MI
Montgomery	NM, NN	NR	GX	MT	MT	MT
Neshoba	NP, NR	NT, NV	GS	NE, NF	NE, NF	NE
Newton	NV, NW	NX	GN	NW	NV, NW	NU
Noxubee	NZ	PA	GL	NX	NX	NX
Oktibbeha	OK, OL	PD, PE	GG, GH	KT, KU	KT, KU	KT
Panola	PA, PB, PD	PH, PJ, PL	GB	PA, PB, PF	PA, PB (Batesville); PC (Sardis)	PA
Pearl River	PF–PH	PN, PP, PR	FR, FS, FV, FW	PR–PT	PR–PU	PR
Perry	PK, PL	PV	FN	PE	PE	PE
Pike	PM–PO	PX, PY	FG	PK, PL	PK–PM	PJ
Pontotoc	PT, PV	RC	FB, FC	PC	PN, PP, PQ	PN
Prentiss	PW–PY	RF	EX, EY	PN, PP	PW, PX	PW
Quitman	RA	RJ	EV	QT	QT	QT
Rankin	RK–RP	RL–RT	EE–EL	RA–RZ	RA–RZ	RA
Scott	SA, SB	SB	DZ, EA	SC	SC, SD	SB
Sharkey	SF	SG	DX	SH	SH	SH
Simpson	SH, SI	SJ	DP, DR	SP, SQ	SP, SR	SP
Smith	SM	SM	DH	SM	SM, SN	SL
Stone	SP	SP	DD	ST	ST, SU	ST
Sunflower	SS, ST	SS, ST	CX, CY	SF	SF, SG	SE
Tallahatchie	TA, TE	TA, TC	CS, CV	TL	TL	TK
Tate	TG, TH	TG, TH	CN, CP	TA, TB	TA, TB	TA
Tippah	TJ, TK	TK, TN	CJ, CK	TP, TQ	TP, TQ	TP
Tishomingo	TN	TP	CE	TS	TS, TT	TS
Tunica	TT	TV	BY	TN	TN	TN
Union	UN, UO	VA	BW	UN, UP	UN, UP	UN
Walthall	WA	VE	BP	WL	WL, WM	WH
Warren	WC–WE	VG, VH, VJ	BH	WA, WB	WA-WD	WA
Washington	WJ–WM	WA–WC	AZ, BB	WS, WT	WS–WW	WR
Wayne	WV	WN	AW	WY	WY, WZ	WX
Webster	WY	WS	AT	WE	WE	WE
Wilkinson	XA	WV	AN	WK	WK	WJ
Winston	XW	WX	AJ	WN	WN, WP	WN
Yalobusha	YA, YJ	YA, YC	AD, AG	YL	YL	YL
Yazoo	YT, YV	YT	AA	YZ	YZ, YA	YA
Rental car		AR, AS	WR, WS	WR	WR	

== Non-passenger plates ==
Image	Type	First issued	Design	Serial format	Serials issued	Notes
	Ambulance		As current passenger base; "AMBULANCE" embossed at bottom	AM 1234	AM 1001 to present	
	Church Bus		As current passenger base; "CHURCH BUS" embossed at bottom	CB 12345	CB 1 to present	
	Disabled		As current passenger base	D/B 12345		
	Fleet		As current passenger base; "FLEET" embossed at bottom	FL 12345	FL 00001 to present	
	Hearse		As current passenger base; "HEARSE" embossed at bottom	HR 1234	HR 1001 to present	
	Motorcycle		Similar to current passenger base	M/C 12345; M/C A1234	M/C 1001 to present M/C A0001 to present	
	School Bus		As current passenger base; "SCHOOL BUS" embossed at bottom	SB 12345	SB 1 to present	
	Taxi		As current passenger base; "TAXI" embossed at bottom	TX 1234	TX 0001 to present	
	Truck	As current passenger base	AB1 234	Issued in blocks by county		

== Optional / specialty plates ==
Many different specialty tags are available. In fiscal year 2014, a total of 2,749,315 license plates were issued by counties, with 683,550 being specialty plates such as: 165,849 Antique (vehicles older than 25 years), 100,698 disabled, 78,714 vanity or personalized plates, 18,367 MS State University, and 15,596 University of Mississippi.

As of July 2022, most specialty plates have a $33 fee, but college or university plates are $53. The state government has a revenue sharing deal with organizations sponsoring a specialty plate, which can be as small as a single high school. For 2014, $5,113,035 was paid to such organizations.

Image	Type	First issued	Design	Serial format	Serials issued	Notes
	Mississippi University for Women			12W34		
	Antique Car			123; 1234; 12345; 123456; A12345 (current)		No renewal necessary, one-time registration fee. The vehicle has to be at least 25 years of age.
	History + Hope + Hospitality	July 1, 2019	Black serial on white plate; Stennis Flag at left; state name in blue centered at top; motto in black at bottom	1234AB		$30 fee.
	Blackout	July 2022	Black tag with white letters	123ABC		$5 fee
	Tupelo Elvis Presley Fan Club					
