= Vehicle registration plates of Montana =

Montana vehicle license plates

Montana
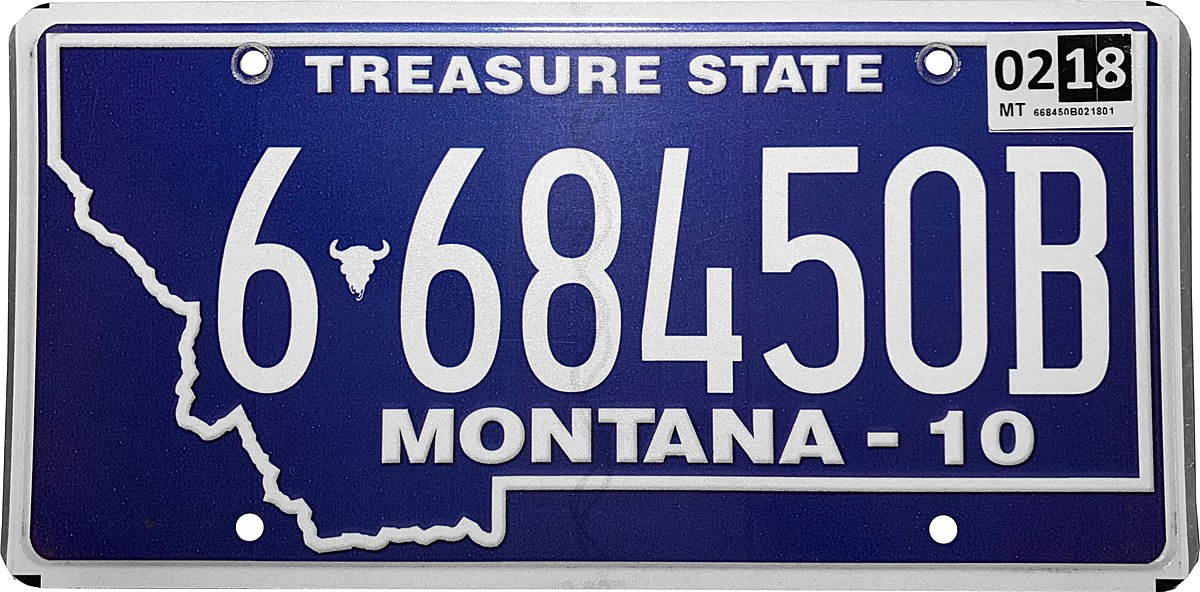

Current series
- Slogan: Treasure State
- Size: 12 in × 6 in 30 cm × 15 cm
- Material: Aluminum
- Serial format: 1-12345A; 10-1234A
- Introduced: 2010

Availability
- Issued by: Montana Department of Justice, Motor Vehicle Division

History
- First issued: March 11, 1913

The U.S. state of Montana first required its residents to register their motor vehicles and display license plates in 1913. As of 2026, plates are issued by the Montana Department of Justice through its Motor Vehicle Division. Front and rear plates are required for most classes of vehicles, while only rear plates are required for motorcycles and trailers.

== Passenger baseplates ==
=== 1913 to 1975 ===
In 1956, the United States, Canada, and Mexico came to an agreement with the American Association of Motor Vehicle Administrators, the Automobile Manufacturers Association and the National Safety Council that standardized the size for license plates for vehicles (except those for motorcycles) at 6 inches (15 cm) in height by 12 inches (30 cm) in width, with standardized mounting holes. The 1956 (dated 1957) issue was the first Montana license plate that complied with these standards.

Image	Dates issued	Design	Slogan	Serial format	Serials issued	Notes
	1913–14	Embossed black serial on white plate; "M" at right	none	12345	1 to approximately 10500	Front plates were perforated in order to allow air to pass through to the vehicle's radiator, while rear plates were solid.
	1915	Embossed white serial on black plate; "MON 1915" at right	none	12345	100 to approximately 14500	First dated plate.
	1916	Embossed light green serial on dark green plate; "MON 1916" at right	none	12345	100 to approximately 24500	
	1917	Embossed red serial on gray plate; "MONT -17" at right	none	12345	1 to approximately 42000	
	1918	Embossed white serial on dark blue plate; "MONT 1918" at left	none	12345	1 to approximately 51000	
	1919	Embossed dark green serial on light green plate with border line; "MONT –19" at left	none	12345	1 to approximately 58000	
	1920	Embossed white serial on black plate with border line; "MONT –20" at left	none	12345	1 to approximately 61000	
	1921	Embossed white serial on maroon plate with border line; "MONT –21" at left	none	12345	1 to approximately 57000	
	1922	Embossed black serial on orange plate; "MONT –22" at left	none	12345	1 to approximately 55000	
	1923	Embossed red serial on white plate; "MONT –23" at left	none	12345	1 to approximately 66000	
	1924	Embossed white serial on dark blue plate; "MONT –24" at left	none	12345	1 to approximately 70000	
	1925	Embossed white serial on red plate; "MONT –25" at left	none	12345	1 to approximately 82000	
	1926	Embossed white serial on black plate with border line; "MONT –26" at left	none	12-345	1 to approximately 90-000	
	1927	Embossed black serial on green plate with border line; "MONT –27" at left	none	12-345	1 to approximately 95-000	
	1928	Embossed black serial on orange plate with border line; "MONTANA–28" centered at bottom	none	123-456	1 to approximately 103-000	First use of the full state name.
	1929	Embossed black serial on white plate with border line; "MONTANA–29" centered at bottom	none	123-456	1 to approximately 115-000	
	1930	As 1928 base, but with "MONTANA–30" at bottom	none	123-456	1 to approximately 107-000	
	1931	As 1929 base, but with "MONTANA–31" at bottom	none	123-456	1 to approximately 103-000	
	1932	Embossed white serial on black plate with border line; "MONTANA–32" centered at bottom	none	12-345	1 to approximately 87-000	
	1933	Embossed orange serial on maroon plate with state-shaped border; "MONTANA–33" below serial	none	12-345	1 to approximately 83-000	
	1934	Embossed orange serial on black plate with state-shaped border; "34–MONTANA" below serial	none	1-1234; 10-1234	Coded by county of issuance (1 or 10)	First use of county codes.
	1935	Embossed white serial on black plate with state-shaped border; "MONTANA–35" below serial	none	1-1234; 10-1234	Coded by county of issuance (1 or 10)	
	1936	Embossed black serial on orange plate with state-shaped border; "36–MONTANA" below serial	none	1-1234; 10-1234	Coded by county of issuance (1 or 10)	
	1937	Embossed black serial on green plate with state-shaped border; "MONTANA–37" below serial	none	1-12345; 10-1234	Coded by county of issuance (1 or 10)	
	1938	Embossed black serial with buffalo skull separator on orange plate with state-shaped border; "MONTANA–38" below serial	none	1-12345; 1/0-1234	Coded by county of issuance (1 or 1/0)	
	1939	Embossed orange serial on black plate with state-shaped border; "MONTANA–39" below serial	none	1-12345; 10-1234	Coded by county of issuance (1 or 10)	
	1940	Embossed white serial on blue plate with state-shaped border; "MONTANA–40" below serial	none	1-12345; 10-1234	Coded by county of issuance (1 or 10)	
	1941	Embossed blue serial on white plate with state-shaped border; "MONTANA–41" below serial	none	1-12345; 10-1234	Coded by county of issuance (1 or 10)	
	1942–43	Embossed white serial on black plate with state-shaped border; "MONTANA–42" below serial	none	1-12345; 10-1234	Coded by county of issuance (1 or 10)	Revalidated for 1943 with red tabs, due to metal conservation for World War II.
	1944	White serial on green fiberboard plate; "MONTANA-1944" centered at bottom	none	1-12345; 10-1234	Coded by county of issuance (1 or 10)	Manufactured on soybean-based fiberboard due to ongoing metal conservation.
	1945	Embossed white serial on black plate with state-shaped border; "MONTANA–45" below serial	none	1-12345; 10-1234	Coded by county of issuance (1 or 10)	
	1946–47	Embossed black serial on white plate with state-shaped border; "MONTANA–46" below serial	none	1-12345; 10-1234	Coded by county of issuance (1 or 10)	Revalidated for 1947 with windshield stickers.
	1948	Embossed white serial on black plate with state-shaped border; "MONTANA–48" below serial	none	1-12345; 10-1234	Coded by county of issuance (1 or 10)	
	1949	Embossed black serial on white plate with state-shaped border; "MONTANA–49" below serial	none	1-12345; 10-1234	Coded by county of issuance (1 or 10)	
	1950	Embossed white serial on black plate with state-shaped border; "MONTANA–50" below serial	"THE TREASURE STATE" at top	1-12345; 10-1234	Coded by county of issuance (1 or 10)	
	1951–52	Embossed yellow serial on blue plate with state-shaped border; "MONTANA–51" below serial	"THE TREASURE STATE" at top	1-12345; 10-1234	Coded by county of issuance (1 or 10)	Revalidated for 1952 with windshield stickers.
	1953–54	Embossed white serial on black plate with state-shaped border; "MONTANA–53" below serial	"THE TREASURE STATE" at top	1-12345; 10-1234	Coded by county of issuance (1 or 10)	Revalidated for 1954 with silver tabs.
	1955–56	Embossed white serial on red plate with state-shaped border; "MONTANA–55" below serial	"THE TREASURE STATE" at top	1-12345; 10-1234	Coded by county of issuance (1 or 10)	Revalidated for 1956 with silver tabs.
	1957–58	Embossed white serial on black plate with border line; "MONTANA–57" centered at bottom	none	1/ 12345; 1/0 1234	Coded by county of issuance (1 or 1/0)	First 6" x 12" plate. Revalidated for 1958 with silver tabs.
	1959–62	Embossed black serial on unpainted aluminum plate with state-shaped border; "MONTANA 59" below serial, stamped "PRISON MADE" beneath state outline	none	1·12345; 10·1234	Coded by county of issuance (1 or 10)	Revalidated for 1960 with yellow tabs, for 1961 with black tabs, and for 1962 with blue tabs.
	1963–66	As 1959–62 base, but with "MONTANA 63" below serial	"TREASURE STATE" centered at top	1·12345; 10·1234	Coded by county of issuance (1 or 10)	Revalidated for 1964 with black tabs, for 1965 with blue tabs, and for 1966 with yellow tabs.
	1967	Embossed yellow serial on light blue plate with state-shaped border; "MONTANA 67" below serial	"BIG SKY COUNTRY" centered at top	1·12345; 10·1234	Coded by county of issuance (1 or 10)	
	1968–69	Embossed green serial on reflective white plate with state-shaped border; "MONTANA" and debossed "68" below serial	"BIG SKY COUNTRY" centered at top	1·12345; 10·1234	Coded by county of issuance (1 or 10)	Revalidated for 1969 with stickers.
	1970–72	Embossed blue serial on reflective white plate with state-shaped border; "MONTANA" and debossed "70" below serial	"BIG SKY COUNTRY" centered at top	1·12345; 10·1234	Coded by county of issuance (1 or 10)	Revalidated for 1971 and 1972 with stickers.
	1973–74	Debossed white serial on reflective green plate with state-shaped border; debossed buffalo skull at bottom left; "MONTANA 73" below serial	"BIG SKY COUNTRY" centered at top	1·12345; 10·1234	Coded by county of issuance (1 or 10)	Revalidated for 1974 with stickers.
	1975	Debossed white serial on reflective blue plate with state-shaped border; debossed buffalo skull at bottom left; "MONTANA 75" below serial	"BIG SKY COUNTRY" centered at top	1·12345; 10·1234	Coded by county of issuance (1 or 10)	

=== 1976 to present ===
Image	Dates issued	Design	Slogan	Serial format	Serials issued	Notes
	1976–91	Embossed sky blue serial on reflective white plate with screened red state-shaped border; red "76 Bicentennial" logo and sky blue buffalo skull screened at top left and bottom left respectively; red band screened above serial containing "MONTANA" in white; screened sky blue "'76" at bottom right	"BIG SKY" screened in sky blue centered at bottom	1·123456; 10·12345	Coded by county of issuance (1 or 10)	A straight-line die was originally used for the number '1', before being replaced by a serifed version.
	1991–2000	Embossed dark blue serial on reflective sky blue and white gradient plate; white and pale blue state outline screened around plate and yellow, orange and purple band, resembling a mountain range, screened above serial; "MONTANA" screened in white at top left	"Big Sky" screened in sky blue at bottom right, along with a sky blue buffalo skull	1P·1234A; 3P·123AB; 10·1234A	Coded by county of issuance (1 or 10)	Letters I, O, Q, R and V not used in serials. Three-digit, two-letter serials briefly issued in Yellowstone County after 3P·9999Z was reached.
	2000–03	Embossed black serial on reflective graphic plate with sky blue background and gradient sky blue and white state shape containing purple mountain range and orange badlands; "MONTANA" screened in blue centered above serial; "2000" screened in white above state name	"BIG SKY" screened in sky blue at bottom left, with words separated by a blue buffalo skull	1·A12345; 10·A1234	Coded by county of issuance (1 or 10)	
	2003–06	As above, but with serial screened rather than embossed	"BIG SKY" screened in sky blue at bottom left, with words separated by a blue buffalo skull	1·A12345; 10·A1234	Coded by county of issuance (1 or 10)	
	2006–09	Screened black serial with buffalo skull separator on reflective graphic plate with gradient dark blue and white background, yellow state outline and mountain range and forest at bottom; "MONTANA" screened in gold, with curved underline, centered above serial	"Big Sky Country" screened in brown between state name and serial	1C-12345; 1C-1234A; 10-12345	Coded by county of issuance (1 or 10)	Still currently revalidated, due to mixed reception of the 2010 blue base (below) and financial concerns.
	2010–present	Screened white serial with buffalo skull separator on reflective blue plate with white state-shaped border; "MONTANA - 10" screened in white centered below serial	"TREASURE STATE" screened in white centered at top	1-12345A 1-AB1234; 10-1234A 10-AB123	Coded by county of issuance (1 or 10)	New serial font, similar to that used in Arizona, introduced in mid-2016.
	2012–present	As 1991–2000 base, but with screened black serial with buffalo skull separator	"Big Sky" as on original 1991–2000 base	1-12345A 1-AB1234; 10-1234A 10-AB123	Coded by county of issuance (1 or 10)	Replicas of 1991, 2000 and 2006 bases and the optional Montana Centennial plate, issued due to mixed reception of the 2010 blue base. Motorists can choose any one of these five plates. Montana Centennial replicas use the same serial format as current optional plates. New serial font, similar to that used in Arizona, introduced in mid-2016. In 2025, Montana updated the format on standard plates that use the county code format.
	2012–present	As 2000–06 base, with serial screened as from 2003 onwards, but with buffalo skull separator	"BIG SKY" as on original 2000–06 base	1-12345A 1-AB1234; 10-1234A 10-AB123	Coded by county of issuance (1 or 10)	Replicas of 1991, 2000 and 2006 bases and the optional Montana Centennial plate, issued due to mixed reception of the 2010 blue base. Motorists can choose any one of these five plates. Montana Centennial replicas use the same serial format as current optional plates. New serial font, similar to that used in Arizona, introduced in mid-2016. In 2025, Montana updated the format on standard plates that use the county code format.
	2012–present	As 2006–09 base	"Big Sky Country" as on original 2006–09 base	1-12345A 1-AB1234; 10-1234A 10-AB123	Coded by county of issuance (1 or 10)	Replicas of 1991, 2000 and 2006 bases and the optional Montana Centennial plate, issued due to mixed reception of the 2010 blue base. Motorists can choose any one of these five plates. Montana Centennial replicas use the same serial format as current optional plates. New serial font, similar to that used in Arizona, introduced in mid-2016. In 2025, Montana updated the format on standard plates that use the county code format.
	2012–present	As 1987-89 Montana Centennial plate (see Optional Plates below), but with serial screened	"100 YEARS" as on original Montana Centennial plate	ABC123	Not issued in blocks	Replicas of 1991, 2000 and 2006 bases and the optional Montana Centennial plate, issued due to mixed reception of the 2010 blue base. Motorists can choose any one of these five plates. Montana Centennial replicas use the same serial format as current optional plates. New serial font, similar to that used in Arizona, introduced in mid-2016. In 2025, Montana updated the format on standard plates that use the county code format.

== Optional plates ==
All optional plates issued from 2003 onwards use an ABC123 serial format. Since 2012, this format has also been used on the Montana Centennial replica plate (above).

Image	Type	Dates issued	Design	Slogan	Notes
	Gallatin Valley Land Trust		White serial on graphic plate; Gallatin Valley and two silhouettes in background; "MONTANA" in grey at top	"Trails & Conservation" in white at bottom	
	Glacier National Park	February 2002 – 2022	White serial on graphic plate with dark blue state outline and Glacier National Park in background; "MONTANA" in blue with white outline at top	"Glacier National Park" in green at bottom	Still valid for renewals.
	Glacier National Park	2022–present	White serial on graphic plate with the northern lights and Saint Mary Lake in background; "MONTANA" in white at top	"Glacier National Park" in white at bottom	
	Missoula Downtown Foundation		White serial on black plate with white state outline; small white heart outline to left of serial; "MONTANA" in white at top	"406" in white at bottom right	
	Montana Concerns of Police Survivors		White serial on black plate; C.O.P.S. logo at left; "MONTANA" in white at top	"HONORING FALLEN OFFICERS" in white within blue band at bottom	
	Montana State Golf Association	2003–present	Black serial on graphic plate with blue sky at top, golf course at bottom and black silhouette of golfer at bottom left; "MONTANA" in cream color at top	"Golf the Big Sky" in blue below serial	
	Eagle Mount Bozeman		Black serial on white plate; "MONTANA" in black at the top, with an eagle flying inside a Montana silhouette.	None	

=== Before 2003 ===
Image	Type	Dates issued	Design	Slogan	Serial format	Serials issued	Notes
	Montana Centennial (original)	1987–89	Embossed blue serial on graphic plate with gold background, white state shape and brown mountain range at top; "MONTANA" screened in brown at bottom right, with a Montana Centennial logo for the 'O'	"100 YEARS" screened in brown at bottom left	1ABC12; 10AB12	Coded by county of issuance (1 or 10)	Also issued to trucks, with 1TAB123 and 10TAB12 serial formats. Remained valid until 1996.

== Non-passenger plates ==
Image	Type	Dates issued	Design	Serial format	Serials issued	Notes
	Motorcycle	1988–present	Embossed dark blue serial on white plate; "MONTANA" at bottom and "CYCLE" at top, offset to left	1-1234; 1-A123; 1-AB12; 10-123; 10-A12; 10-AB1	Coded by county of issuance (1 or 10)	

=== Discontinued ===
Image	Type	Dates issued	Design	Serial format	Serials issued	Notes
	Truck	1976–91	As 1976 passenger base	1T·12345; 3T·A1234; 10T·1234; 10T·A123	Coded by county of issuance (1 or 10)	
	Truck	1991–2000	As 1991 passenger base	1T·1234A; 10T·123A; 10T·12AB	Coded by county of issuance (1 or 10)	
	Truck	2000–06	As 2000 passenger base	1T·A1234; 10T·A123; 10T·AB12	Coded by county of issuance (1 or 10)	Truck plates discontinued 2006; passenger plates issued to trucks since.

== County coding ==
Montana established a numeric county-code system for its license plates in 1934, which remains in use today (except on optional plates). With some exceptions, the order of the codes is based on the respective populations of the state's 56 counties according to the 1930 United States census.

Code	County	County seat
1	Silver Bow	Butte
2	Cascade	Great Falls
3	Yellowstone	Billings
4	Missoula	Missoula
5	Lewis and Clark	Helena
6	Gallatin	Bozeman
7	Flathead	Kalispell
8	Fergus	Lewistown
9	Powder River	Broadus
10	Carbon	Red Lodge
11	Phillips	Malta
12	Hill	Havre
13	Ravalli	Hamilton
14	Custer	Miles City
15	Lake	Polson
16	Dawson	Glendive
17	Roosevelt	Wolf Point
18	Beaverhead	Dillon
19	Chouteau	Fort Benton
20	Valley	Glasgow
21	Toole	Shelby
22	Big Horn	Hardin
23	Musselshell	Roundup
24	Blaine	Chinook
25	Madison	Virginia City
26	Pondera	Conrad
27	Richland	Sidney
28	Powell	Deer Lodge
29	Rosebud	Forsyth
30	Deer Lodge	Anaconda
31	Teton	Choteau
32	Stillwater	Columbus
33	Treasure	Hysham
34	Sheridan	Plentywood
35	Sanders	Thompson Falls
36	Judith Basin	Stanford
37	Daniels	Scobey
38	Glacier	Cut Bank
39	Fallon	Baker
40	Sweet Grass	Big Timber
41	McCone	Circle
42	Carter	Ekalaka
43	Broadwater	Townsend
44	Wheatland	Harlowton
45	Prairie	Terry
46	Granite	Philipsburg
47	Meagher	White Sulphur Springs
48	Liberty	Chester
49	Park	Livingston
50	Garfield	Jordan
51	Jefferson	Boulder
52	Wibaux	Wibaux
53	Golden Valley	Ryegate
54	Mineral	Superior
55	Petroleum	Winnett
56	Lincoln	Libby
