= Vehicle registration plates of Indiana =

Adding vehicle license plates

Indiana
Current series
- Size: 12 in × 6 in 30 cm × 15 cm
- Material: Aluminum
- Serial format: 123A; 123AB; 123ABC
- Introduced: January 1, 2017

Availability
- Issued by: Indiana Bureau of Motor Vehicles

History
- First issued: July 1, 1913 (pre-state plates from 1905 to June 30, 1913)

The U.S. state of Indiana first required its residents to register their motor vehicles in 1905. Registrants provided their own license plates for display until July 1, 1913, when the state began to issue plates.

As of 2026, plates are issued by the Indiana Bureau of Motor Vehicles. Only rear plates have been required since 1956.

== Passenger baseplates ==
=== 1913 to 1980 ===
In 1956, the United States, Canada, and Mexico came to an agreement with the American Association of Motor Vehicle Administrators, the Automobile Manufacturers Association and the National Safety Council that standardized the size for license plates for vehicles (except those for motorcycles) at 6 inches (15 cm) in height by 12 inches (30 cm) in width, with standardized mounting holes. The 1955 (dated 1956) issue was the first Indiana license plate that complied with these standards.

Image	First issued	Design	Slogan	Serial format	Serials issued	Notes
	1913	Black serial on yellow porcelain plate; "IND 1913" in yellow on black section at right	none	12345	1 to approximately 45000	
	1914	Embossed white serial on dark blue plate; "IND 1914" at right	none	12345	1 to approximately 67000	First embossed plate.
	1915	Embossed green serial on pink plate; "IND '15" at right	none	12345	1 to approximately 97000	
	1916	Embossed black serial on white plate; "IND '16" at right	none	12345	1 to 99999	
	1916	Embossed black serial on white plate; "IND '16" at right	none	A1234	A1 to approximately D9000	
	1917	Embossed yellow serial on black plate with border line; "IND 17" at right	none	12345	1 to 99999	
	1917	Embossed yellow serial on black plate with border line; "IND 17" at right	none	A1234	A1 to approximately K2000	
	1918	Embossed black serial on green plate with border line; "IND 18" at right	none	123456	1 to approximately 223000	
	1919	Embossed white serial on black plate with border line; "IND 19" at right	none	123456	1 to approximately 277000	
	1920	Embossed green serial on cream-colored plate with border line; "IND 20" at right	none	123456	1 to approximately 296000	
	1921	Embossed black serial on salmon-colored plate with border line; "IND 21" at right	none	123456	1 to approximately 344000	
	1922	Embossed white serial on dark blue plate with border line; "IND 22" at right	none	123456	1 to approximately 407000	
	1923	Embossed white serial on brown plate with border line; "IND 23" at right	none	123-456	1 to approximately 499-000	
	1924	Embossed orange serial on black plate with border line; "IND 24" at right	none	123-456	1 to approximately 562-000	
	1925	Embossed maroon serial on tan plate with border line; "IND 25" at right	none	123-456	1 to approximately 620-000	
	1926	Embossed white serial on green plate with border line; "IND 26" at right	none	123-456	1 to approximately 667-000	
	1927	Embossed white serial on black plate with border line; "IND 27" at right	none	123-456	1 to approximately 707-000	
	1928	Embossed white serial on maroon plate with border line; "INDIANA-1928" at bottom	none	123-456	1 to approximately 713-000	First use of the full state name.
	1929	Embossed black serial on orange plate with border line; "INDIANA-29" at bottom	none	123-456	1 to approximately 743-000	
	1930	Embossed orange serial on dark blue plate with border line; "INDIANA-30" at bottom	none	123 456	1 to approximately 763 000	
	1931	Embossed dark blue serial on orange plate with border line; "INDIANA-31" at top	none	123 456	1 to approximately 761 000	
	1932	Embossed white serial on dark green plate with border line; "INDIANA-32" at bottom	none	123 456	1 to approximately 741 000	
	1933	Embossed white serial on maroon plate with border line; "INDIANA–33" at top	none	123 456	1 to approximately 742 000	
	1934	Embossed white serial on black plate with border line; "INDIANA–34" at bottom	none	123 456	1 to approximately 722 000	
	1935	Embossed black serial on light blue plate with border line; "INDIANA-35" at top	none	123 456	1 to approximately 729 000	
	1936	Embossed white serial on red plate with border line; "INDIANA-36" at bottom	none	123 456	1 to approximately 779 000	
	1937	Embossed golden yellow serial on black plate with border line; "INDIANA-37" at top	none	123 456	1 to approximately 835 000	
	1938	Embossed maroon serial on cream-colored plate with border line; "INDIANA–38" at bottom	none	123 456	1 to approximately 857 000	
	1939	Embossed dark blue serial on golden yellow plate with border line; "INDIANA–39" at top	none	123 456	1 to approximately 849 000	
	1940	Embossed silver serial on black plate with border line; "INDIANA–40" at bottom	none	123 456	1 to approximately 873 000	
	1941	Embossed white serial on blue plate with border line; "INDIANA–41" at top	none	123 456	1 to approximately 923 000	
	1942	Embossed dark blue serial on golden yellow plate with border line; "INDIANA–42" at bottom	none	123 456; 1 234 567	1 to approximately 1 034 000	Revalidated for 1943 with black tabs, due to metal conservation for World War II.
	1944	Embossed white serial on black plate; "IND 44" at right	none	123456	1 to approximately 899000	
	1945	Embossed white serial on brown plate; "INDIANA" and "45" centered at top and bottom respectively	none	123 456	1 to approximately 894 000	
	1946	Embossed golden yellow serial on black plate; "46" and "INDIANA" centered at top and bottom respectively	none	123 456	1 to approximately 901 000	
	1947	Embossed dark blue serial on golden yellow plate; "INDIANA" and "47" centered at top and bottom respectively	none	123 456	1 to approximately 942 000	
	1948	Embossed white serial on dark blue plate; "48" and "INDIANA" centered at top and bottom respectively	none	123 456	1 to 999 999	
	1948	Embossed white serial on dark blue plate; "48" and "INDIANA" centered at top and bottom respectively	none	A-12345	A-1 to approximately A-27000	
	1949	Embossed white serial on red plate; "INDIANA" and "49" centered at top and bottom respectively	none	123 456	1 to 999 999	
	1949	Embossed white serial on red plate; "INDIANA" and "49" centered at top and bottom respectively	none	A-123456	A-1 to approximately A-112000	
	1950	Embossed golden yellow serial on black plate; "50" and "INDIANA" centered at top and bottom respectively	none	AB 1234	County-coded	
	1951	Embossed black serial on white plate; "INDIANA" and "51" centered at top and bottom respectively	none	AB 1234	County-coded	Revalidated for 1952 with yellow tabs, and for 1953 with green tabs, due to metal conservation for the Korean War.
	1954	Embossed white serial on maroon plate; "54" and "INDIANA" centered at top and bottom respectively	none	AB 1234	County-coded	Revalidated for 1955 with red tabs.
	1956	Embossed golden yellow serial on dark blue plate; "IND–56" centered at bottom	"DRIVE SAFELY" on golden yellow bar centered at top	AB 1234	County-coded	
	1957	Embossed dark blue serial on golden yellow plate; "IND–57" centered at top	"DRIVE SAFELY" on dark blue bar centered at bottom	AB 1234	County-coded	
	1958	Embossed golden yellow serial on dark blue plate; "IND–58" centered at bottom	"DRIVE SAFELY" on golden yellow bar centered at top	AB 1234	County-coded	
	1959	Embossed dark blue serial on golden yellow plate; "IND–59" centered at top	"LINCOLN YEAR" on dark blue bar centered at bottom	AB 1234	County-coded	Commemorated the 150th anniversary of the birth of Abraham Lincoln, who lived in Indiana from 1816 to 1830.
	1960	Embossed white serial on dark blue plate; "IND–60" centered at bottom	"SAFETY PAYS" on white bar centered at top	AB 1234	County-coded	
	1961	Embossed white serial on red plate; "IND–61" centered at top	"SAFETY PAYS" on white bar centered at bottom	AB 1234	County-coded	
	1962	Embossed golden yellow serial on black plate; "IND–62" centered at bottom	"SAFETY PAYS" on golden yellow bar centered at top	AB 1234	County-coded	
	1963	Embossed golden yellow serial on blue plate; "1963" and "INDIANA" centered at top and bottom respectively	none	0A1234; 00A1234	County-coded	
	1964	Embossed reflective white serial on red plate; "INDIANA" and "1964" centered at top and bottom respectively	none	0A1234; 00A1234	County-coded	
	1965	Embossed reflective white serial on dark green plate; "1965" and "INDIANA" centered at top and bottom respectively	none	0A1234; 00A1234	County-coded	
	1966	Embossed black serial on reflective white plate; "IND–66" centered at bottom	"150TH YEAR" centered at top	0A1234; 00A1234	County-coded	Commemorated Indiana's 150 years of statehood.
	1967	Embossed red serial on reflective white plate; "1967" and "INDIANA" centered at top and bottom respectively	none	0A1234; 00A1234	County-coded	
	1968	Embossed blue serial on reflective white plate; "INDIANA" and "1968" centered at top and bottom respectively	none	0A1234; 00A1234	County-coded	
	1969	Embossed black serial on reflective white plate; "1969" and "INDIANA" centered at top and bottom respectively	none	0A1234; 00A1234	County-coded	
	1970	Embossed red serial on reflective white plate; "IND–70" centered at top; month sticker and "71" at bottom	none	0A1234; 00A1234	County-coded	Monthly staggered registration introduced, with the month of expiration determined by the initial letter of the registrant's surname. Plates expired from January 31 through June 30, 1971.
	1971	Embossed blue serial on reflective white plate; "71–IND" centered at top; month sticker and "72" at bottom	none	0A1234; 00A1234	County-coded	Plates expired from January 31 through June 30, 1972.
	1972	Embossed green serial on reflective white plate; "IND–72" centered at top; month sticker and "73" at bottom	none	0A1234; 00A1234	County-coded	Plates expired from January 31 through June 30, 1973.
	1973	Embossed red serial on reflective white plate; "INDIANA" centered at top; month sticker and "74" at bottom	none	0A1234; 00A1234	County-coded	Plates expired from January 31 through June 30, 1974.
	1974	Embossed black serial on reflective white plate; "INDIANA" centered at top; month sticker and "75" at bottom	none	0A1234; 00A1234	County-coded	Plates expired from January 31 through June 30, 1975.
	1975	Embossed blue serial on reflective white plate; "INDIANA" centered at top; month sticker and "76" at bottom	none	0A1234; 00A1234	County-coded	Plates expired from January 31 through June 30, 1976.
	1976	Blue serial on reflective white, red and blue graphic background	Heritage State	0A1234; 00A1234	County-coded	First graphic plate; commemorated the US Bicentennial. The letter in the serial was moved to the bottom of the plate to accommodate the Minuteman graphic. Plates expired from January 31 through June 30, 1977.
	1977	Green serial on reflective white, green and yellow background	none	0A1234; 00A1234	County-coded	Plates expired from January 31 through June 30, 1978.
	1978	Black serial on reflective white, red and light blue background	none	0A1234; 00A1234	County-coded	Indianapolis 500 race cars in background. This issue is thought by some to be a tribute to Tony Hulman, owner of the Indianapolis Motor Speedway, who died in 1977; sample plates, normally numbered 00A0000 in most years, were numbered 00H0000 this year, lending some credence to this belief. Plates expired from January 31 through June 30, 1979.
	1979	Brown serial on reflective white, yellow and brown background	1779 George Rogers Clark	0A1234; 00A1234	County-coded	Awarded "Plate of the Year" for best new license plate of 1979 by the Automobile License Plate Collectors Association, the first and, to date, only time Indiana has been so honored. Plates expired from January 31 through June 30, 1980.
	1980	Black serial on reflective white, yellow, orange and red background	none	0A1234; 00A1234	County-coded	Final single-year passenger plate in the United States. Plates expired from January 31 through June 30, 1981.

=== 1981 to present ===
Image	First issued	Design	Slogan	Serial format	Serials issued	Notes
	1981	Brown serial on reflective white, light and dark brown and black graphic background	Hoosier State	0A1234; 00A1234	County-coded	First multi-year plate in Indiana since 1955, and the first to be renewed with decals (except for plates with numbers up to and including 100, which were reissued annually). Plates were valid through June 30, 1984.
	1984	Black serial on reflective white, yellow, green and red background	Wander Indiana	0A1234; 00A1234	County-coded	Staggered registration expanded to January–October with 1987 expiration. Plates were valid through October 31, 1987.
	1987	Blue serial on reflective blue, white and gold background	Back Home Again	0A1234; 00A1234	County-coded	Small white-on-blue county name sticker in bottom right corner. Plates were valid through October 31, 1990.
	1990	Red serial on reflective white background	Hoosier Hospitality	0A1234; 0AB123; 00A1234	County-coded	Small white-on-blue county name sticker in bottom right corner as on the Back Home Again base. Allen County began issuing two-letter, three-digit serials in 1992 after reaching 2Z9999. Plates were valid through October 31, 1993.
	1993	Black serial on reflective red, yellow and black background	Amber Waves of Grain	0A1234; 0AB123; 00A1234; 00AB123	County-coded	Replacement cycle extended from 3 to 5 years. Early plates had a small yellow-on-black county name sticker in the bottom right corner; this was soon discontinued. Plates were valid through October 31, 1998. St. Joseph County joined Allen County in the issuance of two-letter, three-digit serials after reaching 71Z9999 in 1996.
	1998	Dark blue serial on reflective white background, gold state outline and coat of arms - Indiana and Crossroads of America Printed in dark blue.	The Crossroads of America	0A1234; 0AB123; 00A1234; 00AB123	County-coded	Final embossed plate. Plates were valid through October 31, 2003. By now, 4 Indiana counties were issuing double lettered serials including Allen (2AB123), Elkhart (20AB123), Hamilton (29AB123), and Vanderburgh (82AB123)
	2003	Dark blue on reflective farm scene graphic	www.IN.gov	0A1234; 0AB123; 00A1234; 00AB123	County-coded	First screened plate. The original design had the slogan "Back Home Again" (as on the 1987–90 base); this was replaced with the state's web address before production began. Early plates used a bolder serial font that included full-height letters; this was changed in response to legibility concerns. Plates were valid through October 31, 2008. This was also the last issue to have standardized county coding as part of the plate's serial.
	2008	White serial on reflective dark blue; torch and stars from the state flag at left; county number and name on white sticker at top	none	Standard Version; 123A, 123AB or 123ABC Grandfathered; Version; 00A0, 00A00 or 00A000	Serials not issued sequentially. Letters or combinations of letters are unique to a particular county.	Issued concurrently with "In God We Trust" base. Staggered registration once again expanded to include all twelve months of the calendar year; four dates, the 7th, 14th, 21st and 28th of each month, are used (except in January and December). Grandfathered Version are laid out by county coding depending on demand for them. Some counties may only use single suffix numbers while others may use as much as three.
	2013	Black serial on reflective white fading to gold; number 200 and circle of 19 stars (the 19th enlarged and colored gold) over dark blue state shape at left; expiration date, year, county number and recycling symbol in corners clockwise from top left	Bicentennial 1816-2016	123A; 123AB; 123ABC, No Grandfathered Version	Serial tied to owner	Registrants keep their old license plate numbers upon renewal if they have a license plate in either the 123A, 123AB or 123ABC formats. If vehicle was issued a previous plate with serial 661XYZ for example, the vehicle's 2013 issued plate will have serial 661XYZ.
	2017	Dark blue serial on reflective country scene graphic featuring a covered bridge; expiration date, year, county number and recycling symbol in corners clockwise from top left	none	123A; 123AB; 123ABC	Serial tied to owner	Registrants receive new plates on a rolling 7-year basis, bearing the same number they had previously. This process replaced the previous Bicentennial plates between 2020 and 2026.

== Optional types ==
Image	First issued	Design	Slogan	Serial format	Serials issued	Notes
	2007	Screened white on blue with national flag at bottom; "08" screened in top right corner and county code on sticker in bottom right corner	In God We Trust	A/B1234		While very popular, this plate was controversial as the American Civil Liberties Union of Indiana claimed that it is a symbol of endorsement of a religion. After a lawsuit from the ACLU, the Indiana Court of Appeals upheld the plates' constitutionality.
	2012	Screened black on national flag motif; expiration year screened in top right corner, county code in bottom right corner, expiration date in top left corner and recycling symbol in bottom left corner	In God We Trust	ABC123	Uses multiple iterations through the alphabet; Began at RAA101	"In God We Trust" now appears at the bottom instead of on the left. The changes were made to address visibility issues with the previous version and in preparation for the introduction of the Bicentennial passenger base in 2013. Currently at IAA000 as of October 2026.
	March 4, 2008	Screened black on white with graphic of young Abraham Lincoln at left; "09" screened in top right corner and county code on sticker in bottom right corner	Lincoln's Boyhood Home	B/F1234; B/F123A; B/H1234		Aside from this and the In God We Trust Plates, there are approximately 70 other various organizations, schools, and other entities that offer plates using the same format but come with a $15 organizational fee. See Indiana Plate Types for further details.
	August 8, 2025	Basic Indiana plate inverted to a black background with all white characters (i.e. State Name Serial, County Code and year/month indicator)	None	Any and All Serials (Truck, RV, Passenger, Motorcycle, and Handicap have been seen so far)		Registrants can use any previously registered serial on a new blackout for a $45 fee.

== Non-passenger plates ==
Image	Type	First issued	Design	Serial format	Serials issued	Notes
	Amateur Radio		As current passenger base	FCC call sign		Issued only to Indiana residents holding valid amateur radio operator's licenses.
	Bus		Screened black on white; vertical "BUS" at left	B123AB		
	Disability		Screened blue on white; International Symbol of Access at left	D123A; D123AB; C123A; C123AB		
	Farm Semi-Trailer		As regular Semi-Trailer (Permanent) plate, but with vertical "FARM" at left	FP123AB		
	Farm Vehicle		Screened black on white; vertical "FARM" at left	F123AB		Issued on farm trucks, farm trailers and farm semi-tractors.
	Fleet Vehicle		Screened black on white; "FLEET" at bottom	FL123ABC	FL101AAA to FL389AAD (as of November 2024)	
	Historic Vehicle		Screened black on tan; state seal at left and "HISTORIC" at bottom	AN123A		Issued on vehicles that are at least 25 years old.
	Mini-Truck		Screened black on white; "MINI-TRUCK" at left	MT123ABC		.
	Motorcycle	2008	Screened blue on white; "M CYCLE" at bottom right and "09" at top right	123456	1 to approximately 178000	
	Motorcycle	2010	As above, but with "11" at top right	M123A	M101A to M999Z	
	Motorcycle	2010	As above, but with "11" at top right	M123AB	M101AA to present	
	Municipal		Black on light blue; "MUNICIPAL" at bottom	12345		
	Municipal Owned School Bus		Black on yellow; "MUN. OWNED SCHOOL BUS" at bottom	12345		
	Recreational Vehicle		Screened black on white; vertical "RV" at left	R123AB		
	Semi-Tractor		Screened black on white; "SEMI TRACTOR" at bottom	TC123ABC		Issued on tractors used in combination with semi-trailers. Tractors not used in such a combination are registered as trucks.
	Semi-Trailer (Non-Permanent)		Screened red on white; "SEMI TRAILER" at bottom	SE123ABC		
	Semi-Trailer (Permanent)		Screened black on light gray; "SEMI TRAILER" at bottom; "NO" at top left and "EXP" at top right	SP123ABC		
	Special Machinery		Screened black on white; "SPECIAL MACHINERY" at bottom	SM123AB		Issued on vehicles used to perform specific functions unrelated to transportation on highways, usually on tow trucks.
	Trailer		Screened black on white; "TRAILER" and gross weight at bottom	TR123ABC		
	Truck	2013	Screened black on white; "TRUCK" and gross weight at bottom	TK123ABC	TK101LAA to TK713ORW (as of July 2024)	

== Organizational and collegiate plates ==
Indiana issues a large number of organizational and collegiate license plates. A portion of the fees for these plates is given to the respective organization or college.

=== Organizational plates ===
Plate	Organization	Slogan
	Indy 500 Festival	500FESTIVAL.COM
	American Diabetes Association	American Diabetes Association
	American Legion	LEGIONNAIRE
	Autism Society	AUTISM AWARENESS
	Bicycle Indiana	I Share The Road
	Black Expo	INDIANA BLACK EXPO, INC.
	Boy Scouts	BOY SCOUTS (Used from 2000 until at least 2007)
	Boy Scouts	BOY SCOUTS
	Breast Cancer Awareness	INDIANA BREAST CANCER AWARENESS TRUST
	D.A.R.E Indiana	D.A.R.E. INDIANA
	Donate Life Indiana	Be an Organ, Tissue, & Eye Donor!
	Ducks Unlimited	DUCKS UNLIMITED
	FFA Foundation	www.inffa.org
	Freemasons	FREEMASON
	Greenway Foundation	I SUPPORT TRAILS!
	Habitat For Humanity	Help build it!
	Indiana 4-H Foundation	4-H Foundation
	Indiana Arts Commission	CELEBRATE THE ARTS
	Indiana Association of Chiefs of Police	CHIEFS OF POLICE IACP FOUNDATION
	Indiana Association of Pregnancy Centers	Choose Life
	Indiana Blood Center	indiana BLOOD CENTER
	Indiana Coal Mining Institute	COAL KEEPS THE LIGHTS ON!
	Indiana Department of Education	Hoosier Family of Readers
	Indiana Emergency Medical Services Association (IEMSA)	Supporting EMS
	Indiana Golf Foundation	THE FIRST TEE OF INDIANA
	President Benjamin Harrison Conservation Trust (formerly Indiana Heritage Trust)	ENVIRONMENT
	Indiana Homeland Security Foundation	SECURE INDIANA
	Indiana Motor Truck Association - Put The Phone Down	INTRUCKING.ORG
	Indiana Organization of Nursing Executives	BE A NURSE
	Indiana Patriot Guard Riders	PATRIOT GUARD RIDERS
	Indiana Recycling Coalition	INDIANARECYCLING.ORG
	Indiana Sheriff's Association	LAW ENFORCEMENT, CORRECTIONS, COURT SECURITY
	Indiana Soccer	WE SUPPORT INDY ELEVEN
	Indiana State Museum (Abraham Lincoln)	Lincoln's Boyhood Home
	Indiana State Police	REMEMBERING OUR HEROES
	Indiana Volunteer Firefighters Association	SAVING INDIANA LIVES
	Indiana Youth Group	INDIANA YOUTH GROUP
	Indianapolis Colts	GO COLTS
	Indianapolis Motor Speedway Hall of Fame	HALL OF FAME MUSEUM
	Indianapolis Zoological Society	Advancing Animal Conservation
	Juvenile Diabetes research Foundation	IMPROVING LIVES. CURING TYPE I DIABETES.
	Kids First Trust Fund	PREVENTING CHILD ABUSE
	Lincoln Boyhood Drama Association	LINCOLN FAMILY ARRIVES 1816
	Lions of Indiana	WE SERVE
	Lupus Foundation of America	SOLVING THE CRUEL MYSTERY
	Marine Foundation of Indiana	SEMPER FI
	National Rifle Association	TEACHING FREEDOM
	National Wild Turkey Federation	CONSERVATION
	Native American	Land of the Indians
	Pacers Foundation	PACERS FOUNDATION
	Pet Friendly - Spay-Neuter Services of Indiana	PET FRIENDLY
	Peyton Manning Children's Hospital at St Vincent	stvincent.org/paytonmanning
	Prisoner of War - Missing in Action	NOT FORGOTTEN
	Professional Firefighters	FIREFIGHTERS
	Riley Hospital for Children	RILEY HOSPITAL FOR CHILDREN
	Shrine Association	Indiana Shriner
	Special Olympics of Indiana	Special Olympics Indiana
	Tony Stewart Foundation	ACCELERATING CHANGE
	To Your Health	To Your Health

=== Collegiate plates ===
Plate	College
	Anderson University
	Ball State University
	Bethel College (Note: Not currently issued as of July 2025, per the Indiana BMV website.)
	Butler University
	DePauw University
	Earlham College
	Franklin College
	Grace College and Seminary
	Hanover College
	Huntington University
	Indiana Institute of Technology
	Indiana State University
	Indiana University
	Indiana University Indianapolis
	Indiana University Purdue University Fort Wayne (Note: IPFW was dissolved in 2018 and replaced by Indiana University Fort Wayne and Purdue University Fort Wayne. As of July 2025, neither successor campus has an available plate.)
	Indiana University Purdue University Indianapolis (Note: IUPUI was dissolved in 2024 and replaced by Indiana University Indianapolis and Purdue University in Indianapolis. The new Purdue campus does not have a plate design. The IUPUI athletic program was inherited by IU Indy; the program's logo, which appeared on IUPUI issues, was transferred to the current IU Indy plates.)
	Indiana Wesleyan University
	Ivy Tech Community College
	Manchester University
	Marian University
	Martin University
	Purdue University
	Rose-Hulman Institute of Technology
	Saint Joseph's College
	Saint Mary-of-the-Woods College
	Saint Mary's College
	Taylor University
	Trine University
	University of Evansville
	University of Indianapolis
	University of Notre Dame
	University of Saint Francis
	University of Southern Indiana
	Valparaiso University
	Vincennes University
	Wabash College

== Military plates ==
Indiana also issues several military-related license plates. Most are available for veterans only.

Plate(s)	Representation	Eligibility
	Hoosier Veteran (all branches of service)	Verify Veteran Status with one of the following: A US Uniformed Services Retiree ID card; A DD214 or DD215; US military discharge papers; Indiana ID with Veteran Status (V or AM)
	Disabled Hoosier Veteran	Certified by Indiana Department of Veteran Affairs
	Ex-Prisoner of War	Certified by Indiana Department of Veteran Affairs
	Gold Star Family	Spouse, Parent, Grandparents, Great-Grandparents, Siblings, or Children of anyone who died while serving on duty in the military - active, Reserve or National Guard Must Provide Official DD1300
	Pearl Harbor Survivors Association	Any military document verifying the person was an active member of the United States Armed Forces and served at Pearl Harbor at the time of the Pearl Harbor attacks.
	Purple Heart	Certified by Indiana Department of Veteran Affairs
	Support Our Troops	Any Indiana Resident; supports the Military Family Relief Fund

== Temporary plates ==
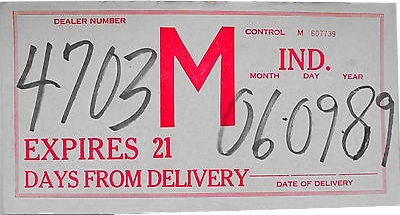
1989

== New plate prefixing ==
Starting in 2010 special plates such as the handicapped, POW, National Guard, Disabled American Veteran that use the background of the standard plates will no longer use just numbers. Instead they will now use a predetermined prefix of three numbers and one or two suffix letters depending on if they have one or two prefix numbers. In all the max total characters will amount to six and, except the Disabled American Veteran and Purple Heart plate will use the background of the standard plate. Starting in 2015, the colors of these plates, with the exception of the Hoosier Veteran and Purple Heart plates, will invert, producing plates with dark blue serials on a white background.

- Recreational Vehicles - R123A or R123AB
- Handicapped -
  D123A or D123AB
  C123A or C123AB
  H123A or H123AB
- Disabled American Veteran - DH123A or DF123A
- Pearl Harbor Survivor - PH1234
- Ex-Prisoner of War - PW123A
- National Guard - NG123A
- Purple Heart - PH123A or PH123 (Handicapped)
- Gold Star Family - GF123

Starting in 2012 veterans of each of the five branches of the armed forces will be able, for an extra $15, to obtain a plate with the seal of the Army, Navy, Air Force, Marine Corps or Coast Guard beginning in 2012. The $15 fee will benefit the state's Military Family Relief Fund.

- Air Force Veteran - VA1234 or VA123A
- Army Veteran - AV1234 or AV123A
- Coast Guard Veteran - CV1234 or CV123A
- Marine Corps Veteran - VM1234 or VM123A
- Navy Veteran - NY1234, NY123A, or FL1234
- Merchant Marine Veteran - MM1234

=== Trucks and trailers ===
Indiana maintains separate plates for trucks, trailers, tractors/trailers, and farm vehicles. Except for farm and motorcycle vehicles, the plates follow an eight character AB123CDE format. All following plates use a plain white background

- Standard Truck - TK123KAA, TK123LAA, TK123MAA, TK123NAA, TK123OAA, TK123PAA
- Tractor Rig - SP123ABC
- Farm Vehicles - F123AB
- Small Trailer - TR123LAA
- Semi Trailer - ST123ABC
- Motorcycle Standard - M123AB

== County coding ==
From 1950 to 1962, the Indiana Bureau of Motor Vehicles issued standard passenger plates bearing a two-letter prefix which identified the county in which the vehicle was registered. Smaller counties were issued only one two-letter codes, while larger counties were issued a series of two-letter codes to accommodate the number of registrations.

=== List of county two-letter prefixes ===
- JA-JC - Adams
- DD-DH - Allen
- ZA-ZB - Bartholomew
- ND-NF - Benton
- ZD-ZE - Blackford
- HA - Boone
- YE - Brown
- QC - Carroll
- SS-ST - Cass
- WA - Clark
- FA-FB - Clay
- XA - Clinton
- ZG - Crawford
- XG-XH - Daviess
- CA-CB - Dearborn
- LC - Decatur
- UA-UC - DeKalb
- JJ-JK - Delaware
- PF - Dubois
- GG-GK - Elkhart
- ZC - Fayette
- WW-WX - Floyd
- XJ-XL - Fountain
- TD - Franklin
- TC - Fulton
- NA - Gibson
- NN-NR - Grant
- MA-MC - Greene
- SA-SB - Hamilton
- UD - Hancock
- XD - Harrison
- EA-EC - Hendricks
- QQ-QS - Henry
- PP-PW - Howard
- UT-UU - Huntington
- SJ-SL - Jackson
- GF - Jasper
- LA-LB - Jay
- EJ - Jefferson
- LD - Jennings
- KA-KC - Johnson
- TT-TU - Knox
- RR - Kosciusko
- YD - LaGrange
- CC-CQ - Lake
- LL-LN - LaPorte
- QA-QB - Lawrence
- FF-FK - Madison
- AA-AU - Marion
- YA-YB - Marshall
- FM - Martin
- ZY-ZZ - Miami
- VV-VW - Monroe
- TA - Montgomery
- WF-WG - Morgan
- ME-MF - Newton
- PA-PC - Noble
- XE - Ohio
- SE - Orange
- KN - Owen
- UE - Parke
- PY - Perry
- QD - Pike
- XX - Porter
- HD - Posey
- RD - Pulaski
- NC - Putnam
- YX-YZ - Randolph
- SC-SD - Ripley
- VE-VF - Rush
- BB-BH - Saint Joseph
- JD - Scott
- RA-RB - Shelby
- SP - Spencer
- VJ-VK - Starke
- SU - Steuben
- YF-YH - Sullivan
- GD - Switzerland
- MM-MN, MP - Tippecanoe
- DC - Tipton
- ED - Union
- EE-EH - Vanderburgh
- FC-FD - Vermillion
- HH-HK - Vigo
- VA-VB - Wabash
- HE - Warren
- JF - Warrick
- WD - Washington
- KK-KM - Wayne
- GB-GC - Wells
- MG - White
- DA-DB - Whitley

From 1963 through 2008, the Indiana Bureau of Motor Vehicles issued standard passenger plates bearing a one- or two-digit prefix identifying the county in which the vehicle was registered. These prefixes were assigned to each county in alphabetical order, beginning with 1 for Adams County and ending with 92 for Whitley County; prefixes 93 through 99 were reserved as overflow for the state's two most populous counties, Marion (93, 95, 97, 98 and 99) and Lake (94 and 96).

In each county, serials consisted of the prefix followed by one letter and up to four digits, progressing sequentially. In 1992, Allen County reached 2Z9999 and subsequently introduced a new format with the prefix followed by two letters and three digits (beginning with 2AA101); this format was later used in St. Joseph (71), Hamilton (29), Elkhart (20) and Vanderburgh (82) Counties.

Following the introduction of multi-year plates in 1981, plates with serials containing numbers above 100 were revalidated with decals, while those with serials containing numbers 1 through 100 continued to be issued annually.

In 2008, new serial formats were introduced with the white-on-blue torch base, consisting of three digits followed by one, two or three random letters. However, the county number system was retained through the use of decals at the top of each plate displaying both the county number and name, with the overflow numbers for Marion and Lake Counties discontinued.

The no-cost alternative "In God We Trust" plate introduced in 2007 featured the county number on a sticker at the bottom right corner of the plate. The revised "In God We Trust" plate, introduced in 2012, has the number screened onto the bottom right corner; this technique was subsequently adopted on standard passenger plates, beginning with the Bicentennial base in 2013. Since 2013, the following numbers appear at the bottom corner of every plate issued in the state from passenger plates, to truck plates, municipal, even motorcycle plates.

=== List of county numbers ===
- 01 - Adams
- 02 - Allen
- 03 - Bartholomew
- 04 - Benton
- 05 - Blackford
- 06 - Boone
- 07 - Brown
- 08 - Carroll
- 09 - Cass
- 10 - Clark
- 11 - Clay
- 12 - Clinton
- 13 - Crawford
- 14 - Daviess
- 15 - Dearborn
- 16 - Decatur
- 17 - DeKalb
- 18 - Delaware
- 19 - Dubois
- 20 - Elkhart
- 21 - Fayette
- 22 - Floyd
- 23 - Fountain
- 24 - Franklin
- 25 - Fulton
- 26 - Gibson
- 27 - Grant
- 28 - Greene
- 29 - Hamilton
- 30 - Hancock
- 31 - Harrison
- 32 - Hendricks
- 33 - Henry
- 34 - Howard
- 35 - Huntington
- 36 - Jackson
- 37 - Jasper
- 38 - Jay
- 39 - Jefferson
- 40 - Jennings
- 41 - Johnson
- 42 - Knox
- 43 - Kosciusko
- 44 - LaGrange
- 45 - Lake
- 46 - LaPorte
- 47 - Lawrence
- 48 - Madison
- 49 - Marion
- 50 - Marshall
- 51 - Martin
- 52 - Miami
- 53 - Monroe
- 54 - Montgomery
- 55 - Morgan
- 56 - Newton
- 57 - Noble
- 58 - Ohio
- 59 - Orange
- 60 - Owen
- 61 - Parke
- 62 - Perry
- 63 - Pike
- 64 - Porter
- 65 - Posey
- 66 - Pulaski
- 67 - Putnam
- 68 - Randolph
- 69 - Ripley
- 70 - Rush
- 71 - Saint Joseph
- 72 - Scott
- 73 - Shelby
- 74 - Spencer
- 75 - Starke
- 76 - Steuben
- 77 - Sullivan
- 78 - Switzerland
- 79 - Tippecanoe
- 80 - Tipton
- 81 - Union
- 82 - Vanderburgh
- 83 - Vermillion
- 84 - Vigo
- 85 - Wabash
- 86 - Warren
- 87 - Warrick
- 88 - Washington
- 89 - Wayne
- 90 - Wells
- 91 - White
- 92 - Whitley

=== Overflow numbers (until 2008) ===
- 93, 95, 97, 98, 99 - Marion
- 94, 96 - Lake

== Renewal date tags ==
In the past, Indiana colored its due date tags by month. Another change to the plate system is that there are only four colors of tags which are the same regardless of the month, whether it be January, June, or December, another change because Indiana used to only issue month tags from January to October. These are all found on the top left corner of an Indiana plate based on the first three letters of the last name of the owner. Note: Business owned vehicles have black tags that expire 1-31 regardless of name.

- 01-07
- 02-07
- 03-07
- 04-07
- 05-07
- 06-07
- 07-07
- 08-07
- 09-07
- 10-07
- 11-07
- 12-07
- 01-14
- 02-14
- 03-14
- 04-14
- 05-14
- 06-14
- 07-14
- 08-14
- 09-14
- 10-14
- 11-14
- 12-14
- 01-21
- 02-21
- 03-21
- 04-21
- 05-21
- 06-21
- 07-21
- 08-21
- 09-21
- 10-21
- 11-21
- 12-21
- 01-28
- 02-28
- 03-28
- 04-28
- 05-28
- 06-28
- 07-28
- 08-28
- 09-28
- 10-28
- 11-28
- 12-28
