= Artists Space =

Nonprofit art space in New York City

Coordinates: 40°43′04″N 74°00′08″W

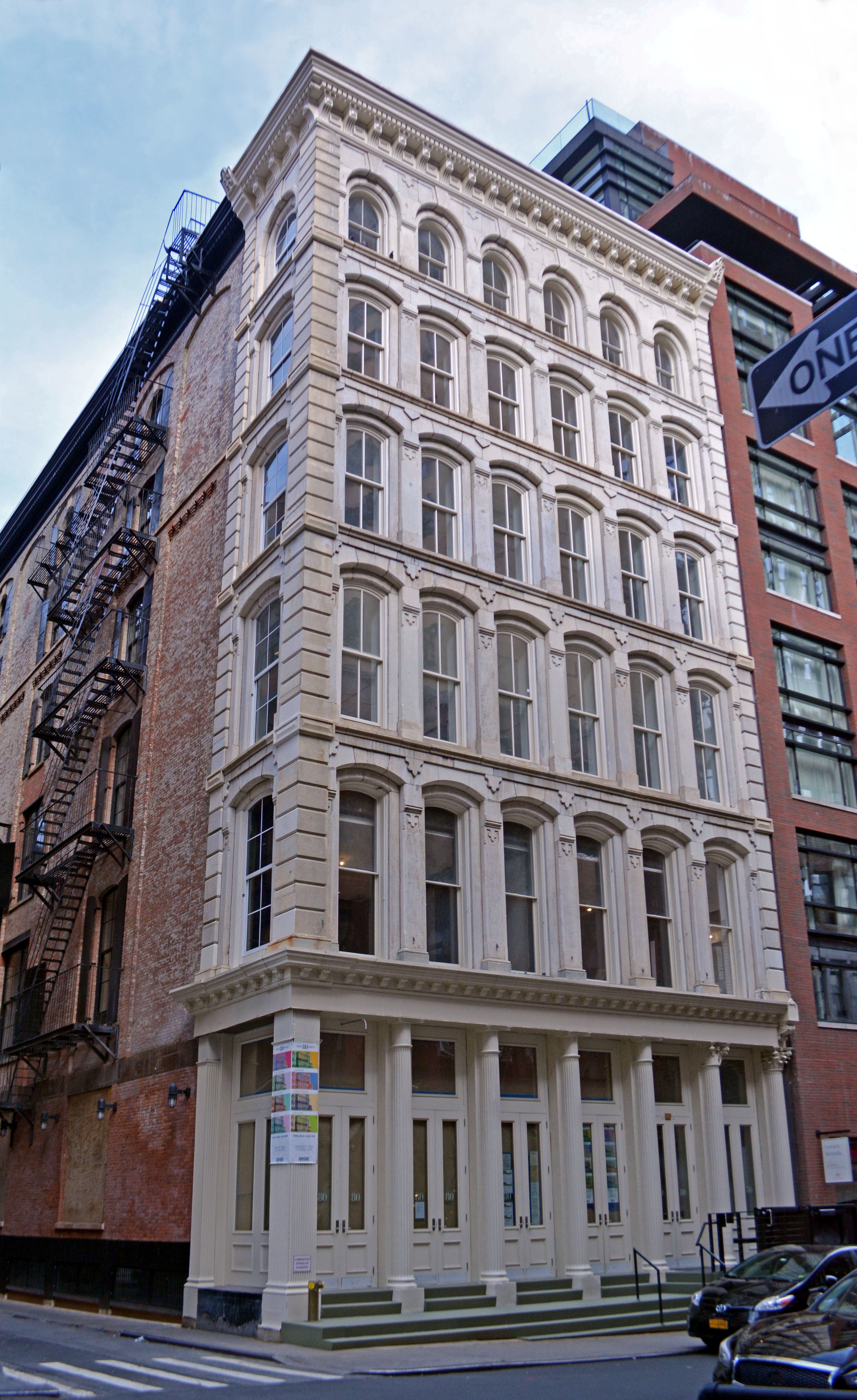
Artists Space at 80 White Street

Artists Space is a non-profit art gallery and arts organization first established at 155 Wooster Street in SoHo, Manhattan, New York City. Founded in 1972 by Irving Sandler and Trudie Grace and funded by the New York State Council on the Arts (NYSCA), Artists Space provided an alternative support structure for young, emerging artists, separate from the museum and commercial gallery system. Artists Space has historically been engaged in critical dialogues surrounding institutional critique, racism, the AIDS crisis, and Occupy Wall Street. As of 2019, Artists Space is located at 11 Cortlandt Alley in the Financial District of Manhattan.

== History ==
During its first year, 21 prominent artists were chosen to produce a one-person exhibition, and chose three unaffiliated artists to show work simultaneously. Artists such as Romare Bearden, Vito Acconci, Dan Flavin, Nancy Graves, Sol LeWitt, Philip Pearlstein, Dorothea Rockburne, Lucas Samaras, and Jack Youngerman were among those chosen to exhibit and select artists. The system provided artists with a great amount of curatorial agency, and the opportunity for emerging artists to gain visibility.

Several artists support services were also established early on, including the Visiting Artists Lecture Series, the Emergency Materials Fund, and the Independent Exhibitions Program. These programs were designed to provide visibility and financial assistance to artists, as well as opportunities to exhibit outside of Artists Space. The Emergency Materials Fund provided grants to artists to present their work at an established non-profit venue, while the Independent Exhibitions Program supported the needs of unaffiliated artists who were producing and presenting their work without institutional sponsorship.

In 1974, The Unaffiliated Artists File was established, later shortened to the "Artists File" in 1983. The file was originally composed solely of unaffiliated, New York-based artists, then was expanded to include artists across the United States, and eventually, to include 3000 artists located internationally. The Artists File was both a free database open to the public as well as a service for representing a wide range of independent artists. Artists Space regularly organized group exhibitions entitled Selections, which featured registered artists from the File. The Artists File was one of the largest artists registries in the world, with more than 10,000 users. It was digitized in 1986.

=== Notable exhibitions and programming ===
In 1974, Edit DeAk organized PersonA, a photo and video performance series focusing on autobiography and institutional critique of the art world. The series took place over four consecutive evenings.

In 1977, Douglas Crimp curated Pictures, an exhibition featuring the work of Troy Brauntuch, Jack Goldstein, Sherrie Levine and Robert Longo. The show featured multimedia works including photography, film, performance as well as painting, drawing, and sculpture. After first being exhibited at Artists Space, the exhibition traveled to the Allen Art Museum, Oberlin, the Los Angeles Institute of Contemporary Art, and the University of Colorado Museum, Boulder. Crimp stated about the show:

"In choosing the word pictures for this show, I hoped to convey not only the work's most salient characteristic-recognizable images-but also and importantly the ambiguities it sustains. As is typical of what has come to be called postmodernism, this new work is not confined to any particular medium....Picture, used colloquially, is also nonspecific: a picture book might be a book of drawings or photographs, and in common speech a painting, drawing, or print is often called, simply, a picture. Equally important for my purposes, picture, in its verb form, can refer to a mental process as well as the production of an aesthetic object."

In 1978, Artists Space served as a site of inception for the No Wave movement, hosting a five night underground no wave music festival, organized by artists Michael Zwack and Robert Longo, that featured ten local bands; including Rhys Chatham's The Gynecologists, Communists, Glenn Branca's Theoretical Girls, Terminal, Rhys Chatham's Tone Death (performing his composition for electric guitars Guitar Trio) and Daily Life. The final two days of the show featured DNA and the Contortions on Friday, followed by Mars and Teenage Jesus and the Jerks on Saturday. English musician and producer Brian Eno, who had originally come to New York to produce the second Talking Heads album More Songs About Buildings and Food, was in the audience. Impressed by what he saw and heard, and advised by Diego Cortez to do so, Eno was convinced that this movement should be documented and proposed the idea of a compilation album, No New York, with himself as a producer.

In 1979, the gallery hosted an exhibition of black-and-white photographs and charcoal drawings by white artist Donald Newman entitled "Nigger Drawings". Linda Goode Bryant of Just Above Midtown Gallery and her colleague Janet Henry mobilized a coalition of artists and critics including Lucy Lippard, Carl Andre, May Stevens, Edit DeAk, Faith Ringgold, and Howardena Pindell, who acted as the Black Emergency Cultural Coalition and published an open letter criticizing the exhibition. They also organized two "teach-in" demonstrations, but only one was successfully held as the gallery locked its doors. Another coalition of artists and critics including Roberta Smith, Laurie Anderson, Rosalind E. Krauss, Craig Owens, Douglas Crimp, and Stephen Koch published an open letter defending the exhibition and the choice of its title. Director Helene Winer argued that the context of the title was not racist in intention, and that art is "a territory where everything can be explored, discussed, revalued." She apologized, stating, "We were not politically or socially sensitive to the implications of using that title in a publicly funded art gallery. I feel very badly for those who were legitimately offended." Artists from the Black Emergency Cultural Coalition insisted on Artists Space being held accountable for the show in the "reality of social-political structure", while artist John Chandler called on Artists Space to "become the alternative space it is truly meant to be" and not "mirror the subtle racism that exists throughout the art world."

In 2011, Artists Space offered its resources to movements like Strike Debt and Working Artists and the Greater Economy (W.A.G.E.), holding a series of lectures and meeting inciting dialogue on art's indisputable relation to politics. Artists Space formed a research partnership with W.A.G.E that led to the development of W.A.G.E's current certification program, which credits non-profit art organizations that commit to paying artists fees that meet their minimum payment standards.

In 2013 Stefan Kalmar curated the group-exhibition Frozen Lakes, which revisited the Artist Space legacy around the picture generation from a younger post-appropriation group of artists. The exhibition included the work Lumpy Blue Sweater (2010) by Swiss conceptual artist Tobias Kaspar, with a hint to The Devil Wears Prada (2006) film and monologue on the color blue. From January to March 2016, Artists Space hosted the exhibition 91020000 by Cameron Rowland, wherein Rowland purchased various units from an affordable manufacturing company named Corcraft that relies on underpaid prison labor. For another work, Disengorgement, Rowland purchased 90 shares of Aetna, who previously issued slave insurance to slaveowners in order to establish the "Reparations Purpose Trust." The trust states that it is to be held until "the effective date of any official action by any branch of the United States government to make financial reparations for slavery."

From September to December 2016, Decolonize This Place conducted a residency at Artists Space, where the Books & Talks location (55 Walker Street) functioned as a headquarters and meeting place for artists and organizers across New York City, many of whom were tied to decolonial resistance at national and global scales. In 2022, the monthly concert series Abasement has been held at Artists' Space.

=== Timeline of Directors ===
- Trudie Grace (1973–1975)
- Helene Winer (1975–1980)
- Linda Shearer (1980–1985)
- Susan Wyatt (1985–1991)
- Carlos Gutierrez-Solana (1991–1993)
- Claudia Gould (1994–1999)
- Barbara Hunt (2000–2005)
- Benjamin Weil (2005–2008)
- Stefan Kalmár (2009–2016)
- Jay Sanders (2017–present)

== See also ==
- Heresies: A Feminist Publication on Art and Politics
- White Columns
- Mudd Club
- Tier 3
- Squat Theatre
