= Vehicle registration plates of the United States for 1997 =

1997 license plates in the United States

Vehicle registration plates of the United States by year
Vehicle registration plates of the United States for 1996	Events of 1997	Vehicle registration plates of the United States for 1998

Each of the 50 states of the United States of America plus several of its territories and the District of Columbia issued individual passenger license plates for 1997.

== Passenger baseplates ==
Passenger car plates
Image	Region	Design	Slogan	Serial format	Serials issued	Notes
	Alabama	Embossed black serial on reflective white plate; pale blue fade with stars at top and pale red fade at bottom; "Alabama" screened in red at bottom.	"Heart of Dixie" screened in blue centered at top; with red heart behind the "of".			
	Alaska					
	American Samoa					
	Arizona	Embossed dark green serial on reflective graphic plate with desert scene featuring turquoise, white, and orange gradient sky, white setting sun and purple mountains and cacti; "ARIZONA" screened in turquoise, with white outlines, centered at top.	"GRAND CANYON STATE" screened in dark green below serial, offset to right.			
	Arkansas					
	California					
	Colorado	Embossed white on reflective green; mountains at top.	None			
	Connecticut					
	Delaware	Flat gold serial on dark blue background; "DELAWARE" centered at bottom	"THE FIRST STATE" centered at top;	1234567	Random, but serials 1, 2, and 3 reserved	1969 Delaware base
	District of Columbia					
	District of Columbia	Embossed blue serial on reflective white plate; screened district flag used as separator; screened red stripes above and below serial; "Washington, D.C." screened in blue centered at top; debossed sticker boxes at top corners.	"Celebrate & Discover" centered at bottom	AB-1234		
	Florida					
	Georgia					
	Guam					
	Hawaii					
	Idaho					
	Illinois					
	Indiana					
	Iowa	Embossed blue serial on reflective graphic plate with light blue sky, white city skyline and gray farm scene; "IOWA" screened in blue centered at top; county name on sticker centered at bottom	light blue county name on sticker	123 ABC	000 AAA to 399 FSK	'D' series not used.
	Kansas	Embossed blue serial on reflective light blue, white and light yellow gradient plate; yellow wheat stalk graphic screened in the center; "KANSAS" screened in blue centered at top		ABC 123	GRS 000 to approximately PAZ 999; SMA 000 to approximately SVC 499	
	Kentucky					
	Louisiana					
	Maine					
	Maryland					
	Massachusetts					
	Michigan					
	Minnesota					
	Mississippi					
	Missouri					
	Montana					
	Nebraska					
	Nevada					
	New Hampshire					
	New Jersey					
	New Mexico					
	New York					
	North Carolina					
	North Dakota					
	Northern Mariana; Islands					
	Ohio					
	Oklahoma					
	Oregon					
	Pennsylvania					
	Puerto Rico	Black on reflective white with fort graphic	"Isla Del Encanto" centered at bottom	ABC 123		
	Rhode Island					
	South Carolina					
	South Dakota					
	Tennessee					
	Texas					
	Utah					
	Vermont					
	Virginia	Embossed dark blue serial on reflective white plate; "VIRGINIA" screened in blue centered at top.	None	ABC-1234		
	Washington	Embossed dark blue serial on reflective white plate with light blue Mount Rainier graphic and dark blue border line; "Washington" screened in red centered at top.	None	123-ABC		
	West Virginia					
	Wisconsin					
	Wyoming					

== Non-passenger plates ==
Non-passenger plates
Image	Region	Type	Design and slogan	Serial format	Serials issued	Notes
	North Carolina	Temporary				

== See also ==
- Antique vehicle registration
- Electronic license plate
- Motor vehicle registration
- Vehicle license
