= Vehicle registration plates of the United States for 1998 =

1998 license plates in the United States

Vehicle registration plates of the United States by year
Vehicle registration plates of the United States for 1997	Events of 1998	Vehicle registration plates of the United States for 1999

Each of the 50 states of the United States of America plus several of its territories and the District of Columbia issued individual passenger vehicle license plates for 1998.

== Passenger baseplates ==
Passenger car plates
Image	Region	Design	Slogan	Serial format	Serials issued	Notes
	Alabama	Embossed black serial on reflective white plate; pale blue fade with stars at top and pale red fade at bottom; "Alabama" screened in red at bottom.	"Heart of Dixie" screened in blue centered at top; with red ♥ behind the "of".			
	Alaska					
	American Samoa					
	Arizona	Embossed reflective white serial with saguaro cactus separator on maroon plate with border line; "ARIZONA" centered at top	"GRAND CANYON STATE" centered at bottom	ABC 123	AAA-001 to approximately NXG-200	Rear plates only since about ETT serial plates in 1989
	Arizona	Embossed dark green serial on reflective graphic plate with desert scene featuring turquoise, white, and orange gradient sky, white setting sun and purple mountains and cacti; "ARIZONA" screened in turquoise, with white outlines, centered at top.	"GRAND CANYON STATE" screened in dark green below serial, offset to right.			
	Arkansas					
	California					
	California		"SESQUICENTENNIAL – 150 YEARS" centered at bottom			
	Colorado	Embossed white on reflective green; mountains at top.	None			
	Connecticut		"CONSTITUTION STATE" at bottom			
	Delaware		"THE FIRST STATE" centered at top			
	District of Columbia	Embossed blue serial on reflective white plate; screened district flag used as separator; screened red stripes above and below serial; "Washington, D.C." screened in blue centered at top; debossed sticker boxes at top corners.	"Celebrate & Discover" centered at bottom	AB-1234		
	Florida					
	Georgia					
	Guam					
	Hawaii					
	Idaho		"FAMOUS POTATOES" centered at bottom			
	Illinois					
	Indiana					
	Iowa					
	Kansas	Embossed blue serial on reflective light blue, white and light yellow gradient plate; yellow wheat stalk graphic screened in the center; "KANSAS" screened in blue centered at top		ABC 123	GRS 000 to approximately PAZ 999; SMA 000 to approximately SVC 499	
	Kentucky					
	Louisiana					
	Maine					
	Maryland	Embossed black numbers on white plate; shield with the design of the Maryland state flag screened in the center; "Maryland" screened in black centered at top	None	ABC 123		Modification of the optional 350th Anniversary base introduced in 1983. Two-year renewals started on July 1, 1992.
	Massachusetts	Embossed red serial on reflective white plate; "Massachusetts" and "The Spirit of America" screened in blue centered at top and bottom respectively.				
	Michigan	Embossed reflective (glass-beaded) white serial on blue plate; "MICHIGAN" centered at top	"GREAT LAKES" centered at bottom	ABC 123		
	Minnesota					
	Mississippi					
	Missouri					
	Montana					
	Nebraska					
	Nevada					
	New Hampshire					
	New Jersey					
	New Mexico					
	New York	Embossed dark blue serial on reflective white plate, with red stripes at top and bottom; red Statue of Liberty graphic screened in center (or at left on vanity plates); "NEW YORK" screened in dark blue centered at top.				Validated with windshield decal.
	North Carolina					
	North Dakota					
	Northern Mariana; Islands					
	Ohio	Embossed dark blue serial on reflective white and gold gradient plate; "OHIO" screened in dark blue centered at top.	"BIRTHPLACE OF AVIATION" screened in red between state name and serial	ABC 1234		
	Oklahoma					
	Oregon					
	Pennsylvania	Reflective yellow on blue with small keystone separator	KEYSTONE STATE	ABC-1234		
	Puerto Rico					
	Rhode Island					
	South Carolina	Embossed black serial on reflective white plate; light blue mountain graphic screened at top and sides and Sabal palmetto in the center; "South Carolina" screened in light blue centered at bottom.	"Smiling Faces. Beautiful Places." screened in black at top	123 ABC		
	South Dakota					
	Tennessee					
	Texas					
	Utah					
	Vermont					
	Virginia	Embossed dark blue serial on reflective white plate; "VIRGINIA" screened in blue centered at top.	None	ABC-1234		
	Washington					
	West Virginia					
	Wisconsin					
	Wyoming					

== Non-passenger plates ==
Non-passenger plates
Image	Region	Type	Design and slogan	Serial format	Serials issued	Notes

== See also ==
- Antique vehicle registration
- Electronic license plate
- Motor vehicle registration
- Vehicle license
