= Vehicle registration plates of the United States for 1996 =

1996 license plates in the United States

Vehicle registration plates of the United States by year
Vehicle registration plates of the United States for 1995	Events of 1996	Vehicle registration plates of the United States for 1997

Each of the 50 states of the United States of America plus several of its territories and the District of Columbia issued individual passenger license plates for 1996.

== Passenger baseplates ==
Passenger car plates
Image	Region	Design	Slogan	Serial format	Serials issued	Notes
	Alabama	Embossed blue serial on reflective white plate; "ALABAMA" screened in blue centered at top, with blue line on either side.	"Heart of Dixie" screened in red centered between state name and serial, with heart outline around the "of"			
	Alaska					
	American Samoa					
	Arizona					
	Arizona	Embossed dark green serial on reflective graphic plate with desert scene featuring turquoise, white, and orange gradient sky, white setting sun and purple mountains and cacti; "ARIZONA" screened in turquoise, with white outlines, centered at top.	"GRAND CANYON STATE" screened in dark green below serial, offset to right.			
	Arkansas					
	California					
	Colorado					
	Connecticut					
	Delaware					
	District of Columbia					
	Florida					
	1990 – March 1996	Embossed black on reflective gradient white and orange; screened green "Georgia" at top with peach graphic for the 'o'; "19" at top left and "90" at top right; county name on sticker at bottom	none	ABC 123	AAA 001 to YZZ 999	Letters I, O, Q, U and V not used in either serial format. The ABC 1234 format used narrower dies.
	March 1996 – January 1997	Embossed black on reflective gradient white and orange; screened green "Georgia" at top with peach graphic for the 'o'; "19" at top left and "90" at top right; county name on sticker at bottom	none	ABC 1234	AAA 1001 to approximately ADM 9999	Letters I, O, Q, U and V not used in either serial format. The ABC 1234 format used narrower dies.
	Guam					
	Hawaii					
	Idaho					
	Illinois					
	Indiana					
	Iowa					
	Kansas	Embossed blue serial on reflective light blue, white and light yellow gradient plate; yellow wheat stalk graphic screened in the center; "KANSAS" screened in blue centered at top		ABC 123	GRS 000 to approximately PAZ 999; SMA 000 to approximately SVC 499	
	Kentucky					
	Louisiana					
	Maine					
	Maryland					
	Massachusetts					
	Michigan					
	Minnesota					
	Mississippi					
	Missouri					
	Montana					
	Nebraska					
	Nevada					
	New Hampshire					
	New Jersey					
	New Mexico					
	New York					
	North Carolina					
	North Dakota					
	Northern Mariana; Islands					
	Ohio					
	Oklahoma					
	Oregon					
	Pennsylvania					
	Puerto Rico	Black on reflective white with fort graphic	"Isla Del Encanto" centered at bottom	ABC 123		
	Rhode Island					
	South Carolina					
	South Dakota					
	Tennessee					
	Texas					
	Utah					
	Vermont					
	Virginia	Embossed dark blue serial on reflective white plate; "VIRGINIA" screened in blue centered at top.	None	ABC-1234		
	Washington	Embossed dark blue serial on reflective white plate with light blue Mount Rainier graphic and dark blue border line; "Washington" screened in red centered at top.	None	123-ABC		
	West Virginia					
	Wisconsin					
	Wyoming					

== See also ==
- Antique vehicle registration
- Electronic license plate
- Motor vehicle registration
- Vehicle license
