= Vehicle registration plates of the United States for 1994 =

1994 license plates in the United States

Vehicle registration plates of the United States by year
Vehicle registration plates of the United States for 1993	Events of 1994	Vehicle registration plates of the United States for 1995

Each of the 50 states of the United States of America plus several of its territories and the District of Columbia issued individual passenger license plates for 1994.

== Passenger baseplates ==
Passenger Car Plates
Image	Region	Design	Slogan	Serial format	Serials issued	Notes
	Alabama	Embossed blue serial on reflective white plate; "ALABAMA" screened in blue centered at top, with blue line on either side	"Heart of Dixie" screened in red centered between state name and serial, with heart outline around the "of"			
	Alaska					
	American Samoa	Black letters on white background, image of palm tree at left.	"MOTU O FIAFIAGA" centered at top	1234		
	Arizona					
	Arkansas					
	California					
	Colorado	Embossed white on reflective green; mountains at top.	None			
	Colorado	Embossed white on blue denim background, mountains at top	None			
	Connecticut					
	Delaware					
	District of Columbia					
	Florida					
	Georgia					
	Guam					
	Hawaii					
	Idaho					
	Illinois					
	Indiana					
	Iowa					
	Kansas	This style used since 1988/91 was discontinued with the introduction of the new gold and blue wheat plate. New plates were given to replace the old ones at motorists' renewal time in 1994. The new plates had a natural "95" screened below the month sticker.		ABC 123	AAA 000 to GRR 999	
	Kansas	Embossed blue serial on reflective light blue, white and light yellow gradient plate; yellow wheat stalk graphic screened in the center; "KANSAS" screened in blue centered at top		ABC 123	GRS 000 to approximately PAZ 999; SMA 000 to approximately SVC 499	Awarded "Plate of the Year" for best new license plate of 1994 by the Automobile License Plate Collectors Association, the second time Kansas was so honored.
	Kentucky					
	Louisiana					
	Maine					
	Maryland					
	Massachusetts					
	Michigan					
	Minnesota					
	Mississippi					
	Missouri					
	Montana					
	Nebraska					
	Nevada					
	New Hampshire					
	New Jersey					
	New Mexico					
	New York					
	North Carolina					
	North Dakota					
	Northern Mariana; Islands					
	Ohio	Embossed blue serial with state-shaped separator on reflective white plate; "OHIO" screened in blue centered at top.	"the heart of it all!" screened in red between state name and serial	ABC•123		
	Oklahoma					
	Oregon					
	Pennsylvania					
	Puerto Rico	Black on reflective white with fort graphic	"Isla Del Encanto" centered at bottom	ABC 123		
	Rhode Island					
	South Carolina					
	South Dakota					
	Tennessee					
	Texas					
	Utah					
	Vermont					
	Virginia	Embossed dark blue serial on reflective white plate; "VIRGINIA" screened in blue centered at top.	None	ABC-1234		
	Washington	Embossed dark blue serial on reflective white plate with light blue Mount Rainier graphic and dark blue border line; "Washington" screened in red centered at top.	None	123-ABC		
	West Virginia	Embossed dark blue serial on reflective white plate; yellow state shape screened at left behind serial; "WEST VIRGINIA" screened in dark blue centered at bottom.	Dark blue bar screened at top with "Wild, Wonderful" in white in the center			
	Wisconsin					
	Wyoming					

== Non-passenger plates ==
Non-passenger Plates
Image (standard)	Region	Type	Design & Slogan	Serial format	Serials issued	Notes

== See also ==
- Antique vehicle registration
- Electronic license plate
- Motor vehicle registration
- Vehicle license
