= Abasement (concert series) =

Monthly concert series in Manhattan, US

Coordinates: 40°43′04″N 74°00′08″W

Abasement is a monthly concert series that takes place in downtown Manhattan, focused on experimental music. It started in 2015 at Max Fish, a bar which held connections to various avant-garde communities. Founder and proprietor of Max Fish, Ulli Remkus, was involved in the Colab scene, and was known for employing artists and musicians. When Max Fish closed in 2020 due to the COVID-19 pandemic, the concert series relocated to Artists Space, where it has taken place since 2022. Artists Space is known for a history of engagement with experimental music and performance in downtown New York, having hosted early performances by bands such as Sonic Youth, DNA, and James Chance & the Contortions. At Artists Space in 1978, Brian Eno recorded No New York, a compilation of the No Wave scene of the time.

Abasement has been curated by Joe Frivaldi and Rob Mayson since 2015. Frivaldi is a member of experimental rock band Electroputas. Mayson DJs Italo-Disco under the name Roboto's Gang on East Village Radio.

Since the concert series began, Abasement has always been structured by four performing artists, a guest DJ, and a projectionist. Media artist Bradley Eros is known for projecting from his slide-film collection. Performing artists are engaged in genres such as free improvisation, jazz, noise, minimalism, avant-folk, and experimental composition.

== Notable performers ==
- Arto Lindsay
- Lizzi Bougatsos
- Lee Ranaldo
- Dorit Chrysler
- Paul Wallfisch
- Dana Schecter
- Nels Cline
- Mick Barr
- Daniel Carter
- JG Thirlwell
