= Stephen Koch =

American snowboarder

- Born: September 6, 1968 (age 57); San Diego, California, U.S.
- Occupations: Adventurer, mountaineer, snowboarder, writer, photographer
- Known for: First person to snowboard on all Seven Summits; pioneer of snowboard mountaineering

Stephen Koch (born September 6, 1968 in San Diego, California) is an American adventurer, extreme snowboarder, mountaineer, and pioneer in the field of snowboard mountaineering, a term he coined. He is best known as the first and only person to snowboard on all Seven Summits, the highest peak on each continent. Koch is also the first to snowboard all the major Teton peaks in Wyoming.

Koch has been featured in Outside, Men's Journal, and Sports Illustrated. He has appeared on Late Night with Conan O'Brien, MSNBC, and OLN.

He is an author of articles for Alpinist Magazine, Transworld Snowboarding Magazine, Snowboarder, Mountain Zone.com, Men's Journal and American Alpine Journal. His photography work has been published in Men's Journal, Outside Magazine, National Geographic Adventure Magazine, American Alpine Journal, and Alpinist Magazine.
