= Corcraft =

State government penal labor provider

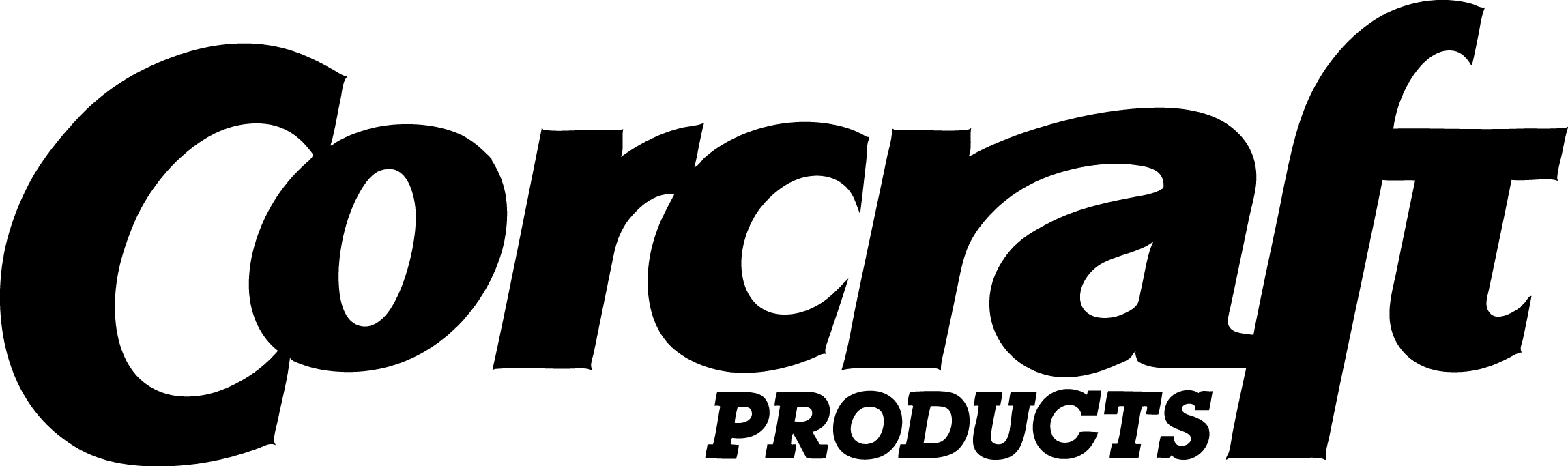
Corcraft Logo

Corcraft is the brand name for the New York State Department of Corrections and Community Supervision Correctional Industries program which creates government and consumer products through the use of prison labor. As of 2024, Corcraft operates in 27 prisons and jails throughout New York State, with over 1,000 incarcerated workers and over 200 civilian employees.

Only state and municipal agencies are eligible to purchase products from Corcraft, as well as a small number of non-profit organizations.

== History ==
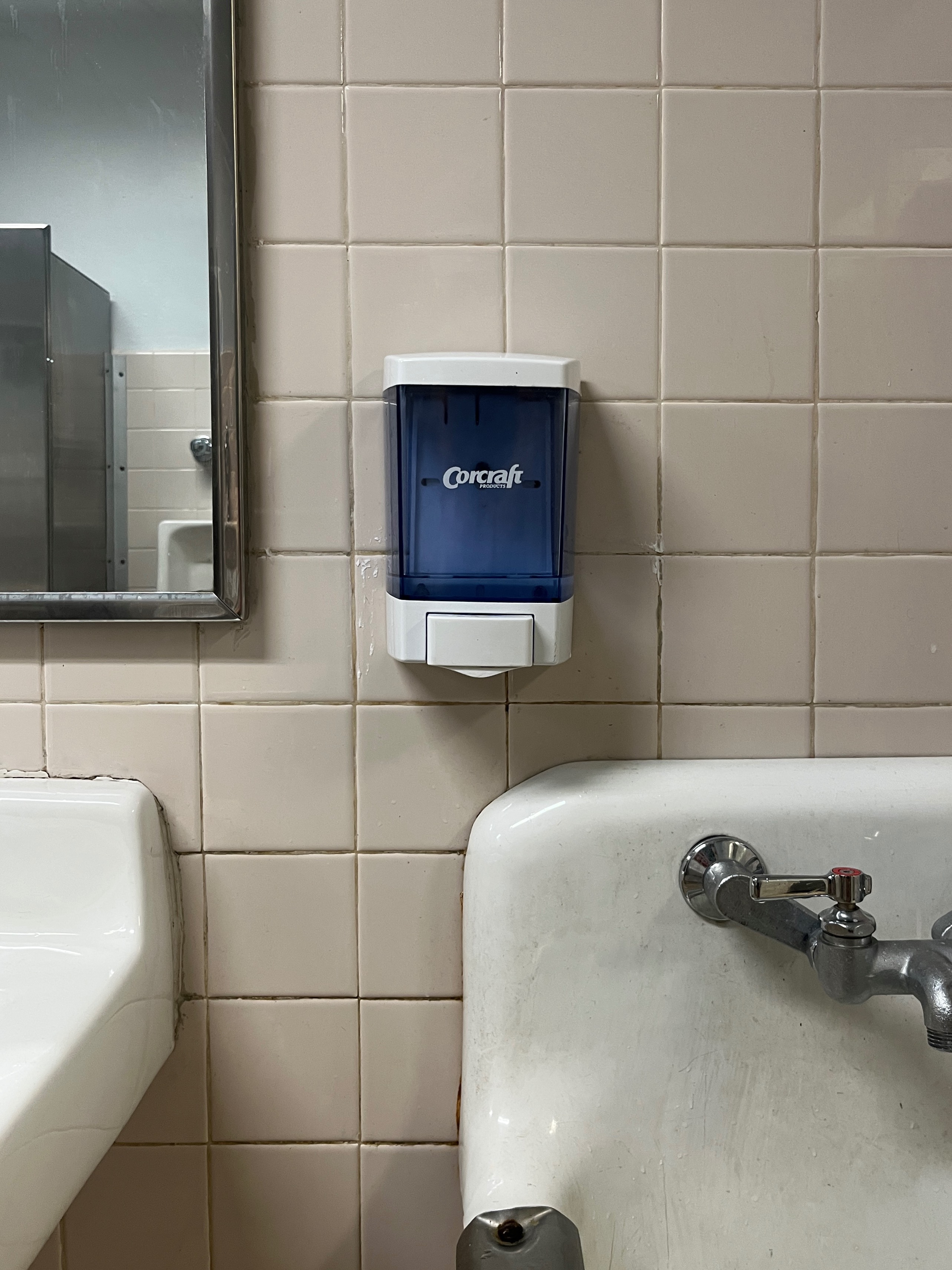
Corcraft branded soap dispenser at the Constance Baker Motley Recreation Center in Manhattan

The Correctional Industries program began at Auburn Prison in Auburn, New York in 1823 to serve internal prison needs. Correctional Industries quickly began to contract workers with private businesses throughout the state, until state legislation outlawed the practice in the late 1880s. In 1896, a provision in the state constitution created the current arrangement used by Corcraft, allowing for State-use of prison labor goods. Incarcereted people at Auburn prison continue to produce all license plates for New York State.

Correctional Industries rebranding as Corcraft dates to at least 1972. Since spreading throughout the state, Corcraft produces a wide variety of products including clothing, furniture, and toiletries. Corcraft also contracts labor directly to other New York state agencies, including the New York State Department of Motor Vehicles. A state comptroller’s report issued in 1997 found that Corcraft operated had been operating at a loss for the previous seven years.

== Use of prison labor ==
Incarcerated workers employed by Corcraft typically earn between $0.10 and $0.33 per hour, substantially below the mandated federal minimum wage. The state is able to avoid paying prisoners the minimum wage as a result of the 13th Amendment to the Constitution of the United States, which allows for slavery or indentured servitude as a criminal punishment.

In 2020, during the first months of the COVID-19 pandemic in the United States, Governor Andrew Cuomo directed Corcraft to produce state-branded hand sanitizer. The prodigious amount of hand sanitizer produced that was ultimately unused attracted attention to the use of prison labor throughout New York State and the United States, and prompted calls for reform.
