= Vehicle registration plates of Curaçao =

Curaçao, Kingdom of the Netherlands
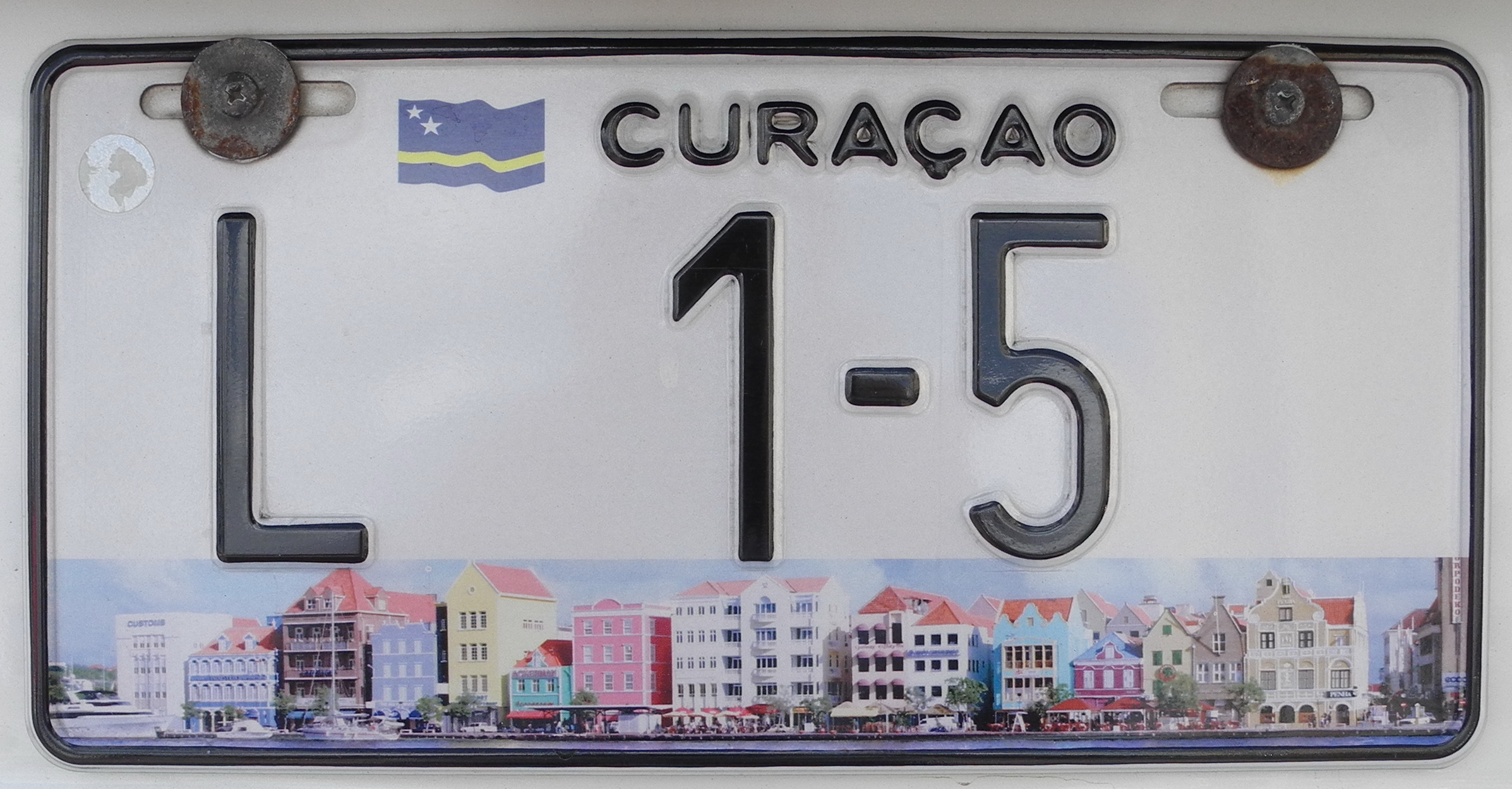
- A regular plate from Curaçao.
- Country: Curaçao (Netherlands)
- Country code: None

Current series
- Slogan: None
- Size: 520 mm × 110 mm 20.5 in × 4.3 in
- Serial format: A 12-34
- Colour (front): Black on white
- Colour (rear): Black on white

Curaçao requires its residents to register their motor vehicles and display vehicle registration plates.

Current plates are North American standard 6 × 12 inches (152 × 300 mm).

== Prefixes ==
- A, B, D, F, G, H, J, K, L, M, N, R, S, T, W, Y, Private Car in format A nn-nn, numbers without leading zeros
- BUS, Bus in format BUS nnn
- BR, Sales Agency
- BF, Moped in format BF nn-nn, numbers without leading zeros
- C, Island Government in format C-nnn
- GAR, Repair Garage
- MF, Motorcycle in format MF nn-nn, numbers without leading zeros
- NA, Netherlands Antilles Government - Discontinued
- POLIS, Police
- TW, Tourist Wagon
- TX, Taxi
- U, V, X, Commercial Vehicle or pickup truck in format A nn-nn, numbers without leading zeros
- WABI, Antique Vehicle
- Z, Heavy Equipment

Image	First issued	Design	Slogan	Serial format	Serials issued	Notes
	1967					
	1976					
	1980					
	1984					
	1986					
	1987					
	1988					
	1989					
	1990					
	1991					
	1992					
	1996					
	2009					
