= Vehicle registration plates of El Salvador =

Republic of El Salvador
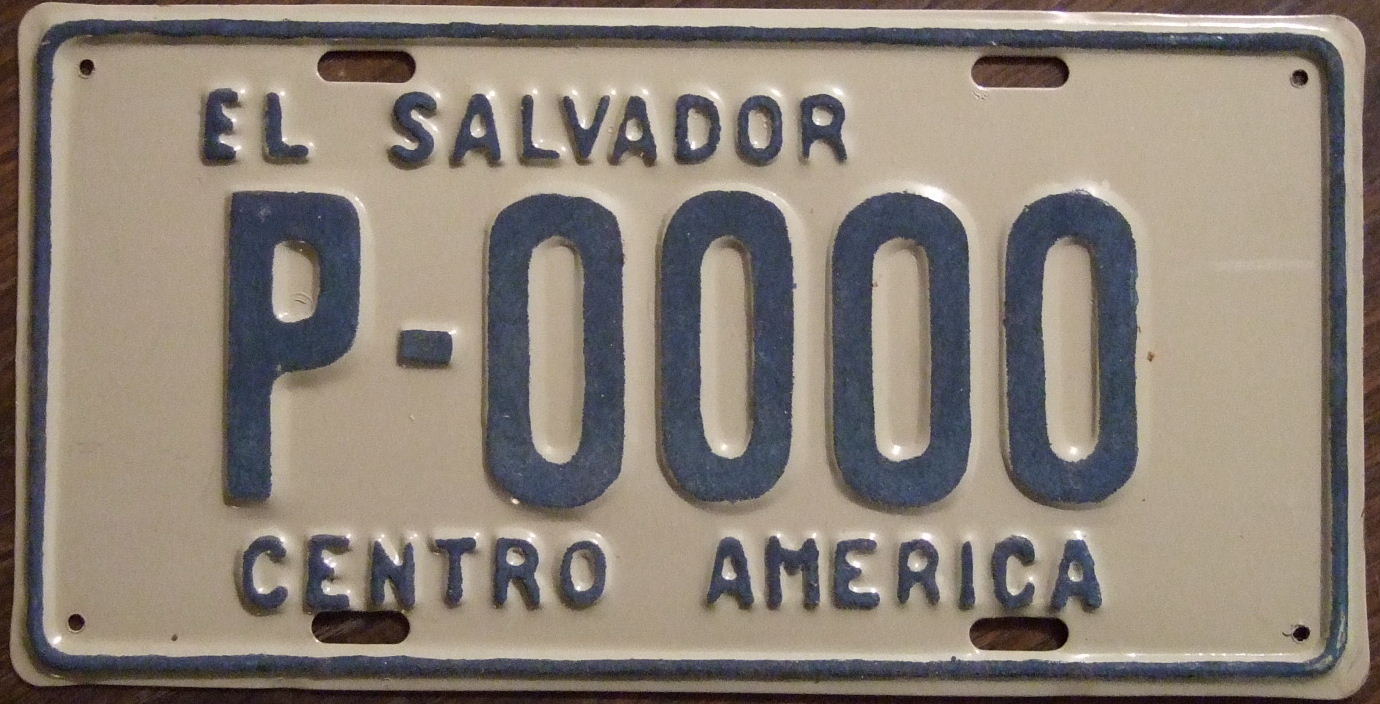
- 1976 sample plate
- Country: El Salvador
- Country code: ES

Current series
- Slogan: None
- Size: 152 mm × 300 mm 6.0 in × 11.8 in
- Introduced: 2011; 15 years ago

El Salvador requires its residents to register their motor vehicles and display vehicle registration plates. Current plates are North American standard 6 in × 12 in (152 mm × 300 mm). The new design started its use during 2011. In the background of the plate, you can find the flag of El Salvador.

Image	First issued	Design	Slogan	Serial format	Serials issued	Notes
	1976	Black on tan		A-1234		
	1976	Black on tan		M-1-234		Motorcycle plate
