= Vehicle registration plates of Dominica =

Commonwealth of Dominica
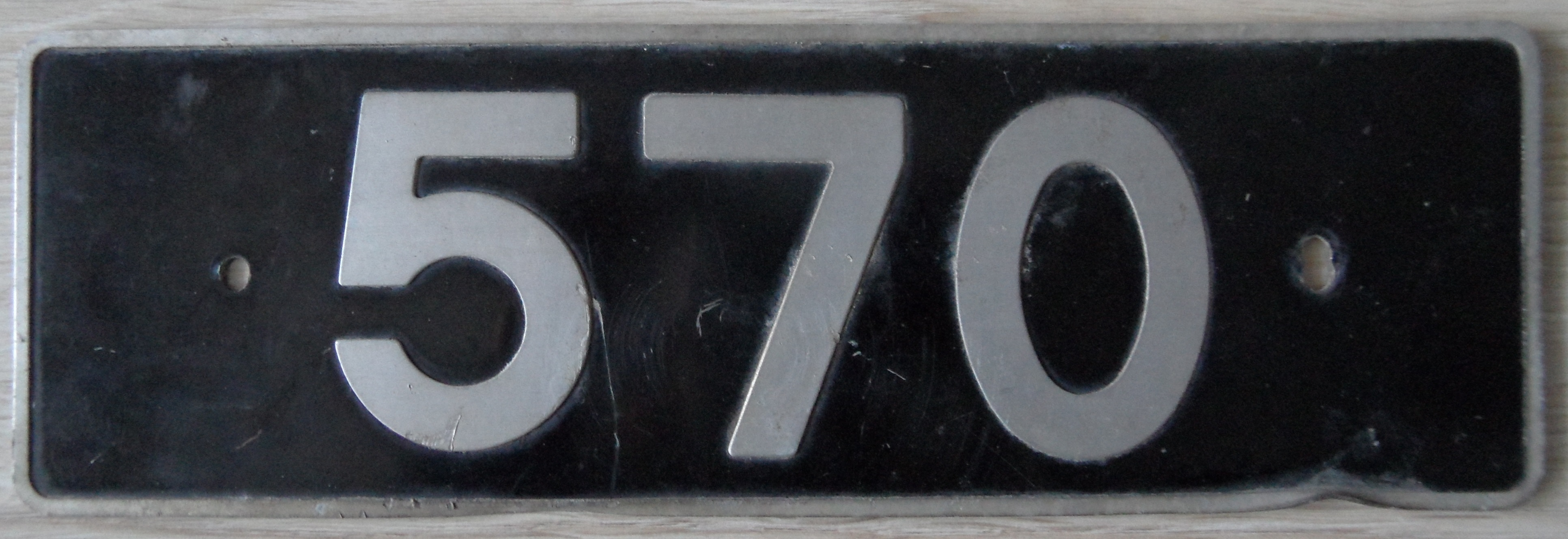
- Current regular legal standard number plate from Dominica.
- Country: Dominica
- Country code: WD

Current series
- Size: 300 mm × 152 mm 11.8 in × 6.0 in
- Serial format: 123
- Colour (front): White on black
- Colour (rear): White on black

Dominica requires its residents to register their motor vehicles and display vehicle registration plates. Current plates are North American standard 12 in × 6 in (300 mm × 152 mm). Vehicles have black on white plates (front and rear) or black on white (front) and black on yellow (rear) plates. The first letter of the license plate identifies the type of vehicle it is. P denotes a private vehicle.

Image	First issued	Design	Serial format	Serials issued	Notes
		White on black	123		
