= Vehicle registration plates of Saint Kitts and Nevis =

Federation of Saint Christopher and Nevis
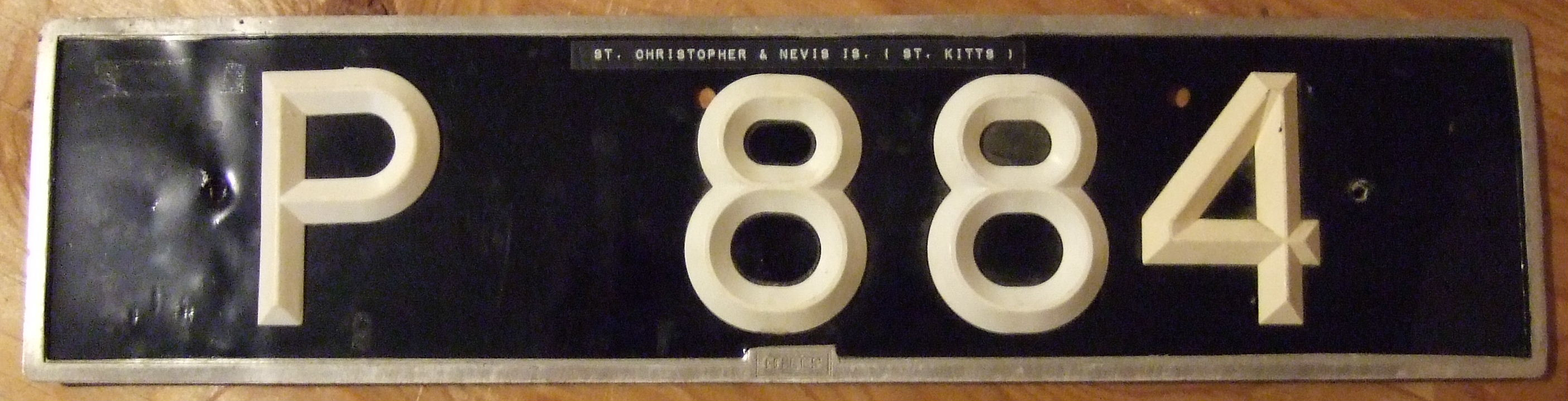
- Regular legal standard number plate from Saint Kitts and Nevis.
- Country: Saint Kitts and Nevis
- Country code: None

Current series
- Size: 300 mm × 152 mm 11.8 in × 6.0 in
- Serial format: P and up to 4 digits; P(A) and up to 4 digits since 1997.
- Colour (front): White on black
- Colour (rear): White on black

Saint Kitts and Nevis requires its residents to register their motor vehicles and display vehicle registration plates. Current plates are North American standard 6 in × 12 in (152 mm × 300 mm).

| Image | First issued | Design | Serial format | Serials issued | Notes |
|---|---|---|---|---|---|
| | | White on black | A 1234 | | |
