= Vehicle registration plates of Costa Rica =

Republic of Costa Rica
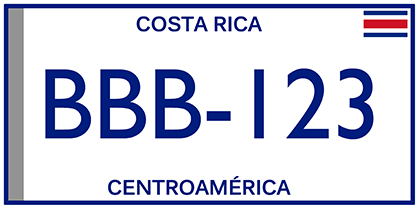
- Costa Rican regular legal standard number plate.
- Country: Costa Rica
- Country code: CR

Current series
- Size: 520 mm × 110 mm 20.5 in × 4.3 in
- Serial format: ABC-123
- Colour (front): Black on white
- Colour (rear): Black on white

The vehicle registration plates of Costa Rica have been issued since at least 1923. The current plate size is the North American standard of 6 in × 12 in (152 mm × 300 mm).

== History ==
The letters "CR" on plates into the early 1940s indicated the country name. The country name has been spelled out since at least 1944. In 1959 the legend "Centro America" [Central America] began appearing on the plates. Annual plates appear to have been issued through at least 1954. For a time the plate's first two characters indicated what city where the vehicle was registered. Multi-year plates began to appear in 1955, but their use was not consistent until the mid-1960s.

Early plates
| Image | First issued | Design | Slogan | Serial format | Serials issued | Notes |
|---|---|---|---|---|---|---|
| | 1961 | White numbers on a dark blue background | | SJ-12345 | | SJ is the city code for San José. |

=== 2013 series ===
New plates for all vehicles were issued starting in mid-2013 and was completed in early 2015. The design included additional security features, such as a hologram at the left side, a security strip running across the plate, and additional elements.

Regular series of 2013 license plates
| Image | Type | Serial format | Serials issued | Notes |
|---|---|---|---|---|
| | Passenger automobile | 123456; ABC-123 | | |
| | Interprovincial bus | 1234; 12345 | | |
| | City and interurban bus | 1234; 12345 | | |
| | Commercial vehicle | 123456 | | |
| | Commercial limited light load truck | 123456 | | |
| | Disabled/handicapped driver | D-123; D-1234 | | |
| | Electric vehicle | ABD-123 | | First available in 2019. Hybrid vehicles are excluded. |
| | Motorcycle | 123456 | | |
| | Taxi | 1234; 12345 | | |
| | City and interurban taxi | 1234; 12345 | | |
| | Historical vehicle | 12; 123; 1234 | | |

Special series of 2013 license plates
| Image | Type | Serial format | Serials issued | Notes |
|---|---|---|---|---|
| | Consular Corps | 1-23 | | |
| | Diplomatic Corps | 1/2 - 123 | | |
| | International mission | 1/2 - 123 | | |
| | Official vehicle | 12-3456 | | |
| | Power executive | 1/2 - 1234 | | |
