= Vehicle registration plates of the Caribbean Netherlands =

The Caribbean Netherlands requires its residents to register their motor vehicles and display vehicle registration plates. Current plates are North American standard 6 in × 12 in (152 mm × 300 mm).

== Passenger plates ==
Plates with the large letter "B" indicate a plate from Bonaire, while the large letter "E" indicates a plate from St. Eustatius, and a large letter "S" indicates a plate from Saba. For plates with different letters, see the non-passenger plate section below.

Image	Issued	Design	Slogan	Serial format	Serials issued	Notes
	1976	Large American Revolution Bicentennial Logo left; serial number right of center at top with large "'76" and smaller slogan below; stacked "ST. EUSTATIUS. N.A." at far right	The Golden Rock	E123		The design features the United States' Bicentennial Logo commissioned by the American Revolution Bicentennial Commission.
	1978	Emobssed dark green serial on white background; "SABA NA" centered at top; slogan centered at bottom; year stacked vertically at right	Unspoiled Queen	S-123		
	2007-2014		The Historic Gem	E 123		License plates start with E for Saint Eustatius, followed by three or four digits
	2011-2017		The Unspoiled Queen	S 123		License plates start with S for Saba, followed by three or four digits The first letter can be R or D depending on the type of vehicle it identifies.
	2013-2018	Embossed black serial on white background with sticker box at right all in the center; "BONAIRE" centered at top with small slogan below; full-color landscape with flora, buildings and flamingo across bottom 1/3 of plate	Divers Paradise	B-1234		License plates start with B for Bonaire, followed by three, four or five digits

== Non-passenger plates ==
Non-passenger plates start with certain letter combinations to denote vehicle type: AB for buses, BF for mopeds, D for governmental vehicles, H for rental cars, MF for motorcycles, TX for taxis, V for trucks and commercial vehicles, and Z for heavy equipment.

Image	Issued	Design	Slogan	Serial format	Serials issued	Notes
	1994	Embossed white serial number centered on black background; "BONAIRE N.A." centered at top; slogan at bottom with sticker box between the two words	Diver's Paradise	V-1234		
	2005	Embossed white serial on dark blue background with sticker box at right all in the center; "BONAIRE, N.A." centered at top; slogan centered at bottom	Diver's Paradise	MF-123		
	2007	Embossed white serial on dark blue background with sticker box at right all in the center; "BONAIRE, N.A." centered at top; slogan centered at bottom	Diver's Paradise	V-1234		
	2013-2019	Embossed black serial on white background with sticker box at right all in the center; "BONAIRE" centered at top with small slogan below; full-color landscape with flora, buildings and flamingo across bottom 1/3 of plate	Diver's Paradise	V-1234		
