= Vehicle registration plates of Jamaica =

The vehicle registration plates of Jamaica follow the North American standard: 6 in × 12 in (152 mm × 300 mm).

== Format ==
The license plates for private cars (introduced in 1987) follows the format 1234 AB. Coding is not provided. The plates use blue lettering on a white background. For motorcycles, the 1234 A series is valid, also without coding and in a similar color scheme.

| Image | First issued | Design | Serial format |
|---|---|---|---|
| | 1987 | Blue on white | 1234 AB |

Coding
| Code | Type of vehicle |
|---|---|
| C | Commercial |
| D | Trade organizations |
| P | Public |
| R | Leased vehicles |

=== Public transport ===
Taxis, public buses, etc. have license plates of the РА1234, РА123В, 1234РА formats. The plates have a red background and white letters and numbers.

=== Commercial transport ===
Cargo and other commercial vehicles have license plates of the CA1234, CA123B formats. The plates have a green background and white letters and numbers.

=== Temporary plates ===
Temporary license plates have the DA1234 format. The plates have a blue background and white letters and numbers.

=== Rental vehicles ===
License plates for vehicles intended for rental have the format RR1234. The plates have a white background and green letters and numbers. The inscription "RENTAL" is located under the main line of symbols. For motorcycles, the 1234 R series is available in a similar color scheme.

=== Government vehicles ===
Government vehicles have number plates in the format 12 3456. The numeric prefix indicates a specified government structure. The plates have a yellow background and black letters and numbers. Below the main line of symbols is the inscription "JAMAICA GOVT". Police use government license plates.

=== Military vehicles ===
Military plates have a British scheme similar to that used in Trinidad and Tobago. Military license plate formats are: 1JDF2, 1 JDF23, 1 JDF234, 12JDF3, 12JDF34, 12 JDF345. JDF — Jamaica Defense Force. License plates have a black background and white symbols, and are usually painted directly on the vehicle.

=== Diplomatic vehicles ===
Vehicles from foreign embassies, international organizations and their staff members have number plates in the format 12 D 345 or 12 X 345. The numeric prefix is the number assigned to the country or international organization. Diplomatic vehicles have the prefix "D", non-diplomatic vehicles, e.g. from non-diplomatic members of staff, have the prefix "X". The plates use blue lettering on a white background.
