= Vehicle registration plates of Saint Lucia =

Saint Lucia
- Country: Saint Lucia
- Country code: WL

Current series
- Size: 300 mm × 152 mm 11.8 in × 6.0 in
- Colour (front): White on black
- Colour (rear): White on black

Saint Lucia requires its residents to register their motor vehicles and display vehicle registration plates. Current plates are North American standard 12 in × 6 in (300 mm × 152 mm). Older licence plates are owner provided and come in different styles.

Image	Design	Serial format	Notes
	White text on a black background. Occasionally black text on a white background.	Two letters followed by up to four digits. Starting in the 0000 format and then P 0000, and then PA 0000.	Used by most privately owned vehicles.
	White text on a blue background. Sometimes indicates the licensed number of passengers.	"TX" followed by up to four digits.	For taxis.
	White text on a green background. Sometimes indicates the licensed number of passengers.	"M" followed by up to four digits.	For public minibuses.
	Red text on a plain white background. Dealership name sometimes indicated on plate.	”DM” followed by up to 3 digits.	For dealers, test drives, auto transfers.
	Black text on a yellow background.	"SLG" followed by up to four digits.	For government vehicles.
	Yellow text on plain dark blue background.	”MP” followed by one or two digits.	For St. Lucia Members of Parliament
