= Vehicle registration plates of Antigua and Barbuda =

Antigua and Barbuda
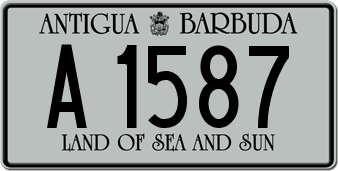
- Regular legal standard number plate from Antigua and Barbuda.
- Country: Antigua and Barbuda
- Country code: None

Current series
- Slogan: LAND OF SEA AND SUN
- Size: 300 mm × 152 mm 11.8 in × 6.0 in
- Serial format: Not standard
- Colour (front): Black on white
- Colour (rear): Black on white

Antigua and Barbuda requires its residents to register their motor vehicles and display vehicle registration plates. Current plates are North American standard 152 mm × 300 mm (6 in × 12 in). The colour of the characters and the background identifies the type of vehicle it is. For example, "A" identifies private vehicles.

Image	First issued	Design	Slogan	Serial format	Serials issued	Notes
		Black on white	LAND OF SEA AND SUN	A 1234		
		Black on gold	LAND OF SEA AND SUN	A 123		
		White on green	None	A 1234		Taxi and Australian standard
