= Vehicle registration plates of the Marshall Islands =

The Marshall Islands
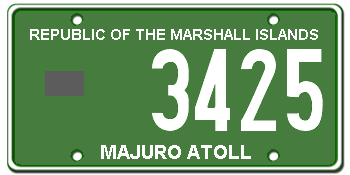
- Country: Marshall Islands
- Country code: None

Current series
- Slogan: MAJURO ATOLL
- Size: 152 mm × 305 mm 6.0 in × 12.0 in
- Material: Silver or wood
- Serial format: 1234

History
- First issued: 1972; 54 years ago

The Marshall Islands requires its residents to register their motor vehicles and display vehicle registration plates. Current plates are North American standard 6 by 12 inches (152 mm × 305 mm).

| Image | First issued | Design | Slogan | Serial format | Serials issued | Notes |
|---|---|---|---|---|---|---|
| | 1972 | Black on white | None | 123 | | |
| | | White on green | MAJURO ATOLL | 1234 | | |
