= Vehicle registration plates of Suriname =

Republic of Suriname
- Country: Suriname
- Country code: SME

Current series
- Size: 300 mm × 152 mm 11.8 in × 6.0 in
- Serial format: Not standard
- Colour (front): Black on yellow
- Colour (rear): Black on yellow

Suriname requires its residents to register their motor vehicles and display vehicle registration plates. Current plates are North American standard 6 × 12 inches (152 × 300 mm). Current plates are black on yellow. Configuration is two letters and four numbers where first letter is always letter P.

Image	First issued	Design	Slogan	Serial format	Serials issued	Notes
	1960s					
