= Vehicle registration plates of Nicaragua =

The vehicle registration plates of Nicaragua must be displayed on all vehicles. Its plates follow the North American standard 6 in × 12 in (152 mm × 300 mm). The background of the plate presents a map of Nicaragua. One or two letters identifies the region followed by a serial number.

== Past plates ==
Image	First issued	Design	Slogan	Serial format	Serials issued	Notes
		White on black	Nicaragua Libre	AB1234		Estatal denotes a state-owned vehicle.
