= Driving licence in France =

French driving licence
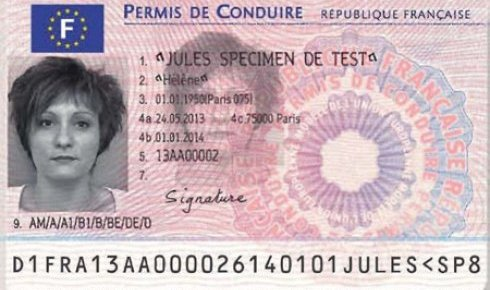

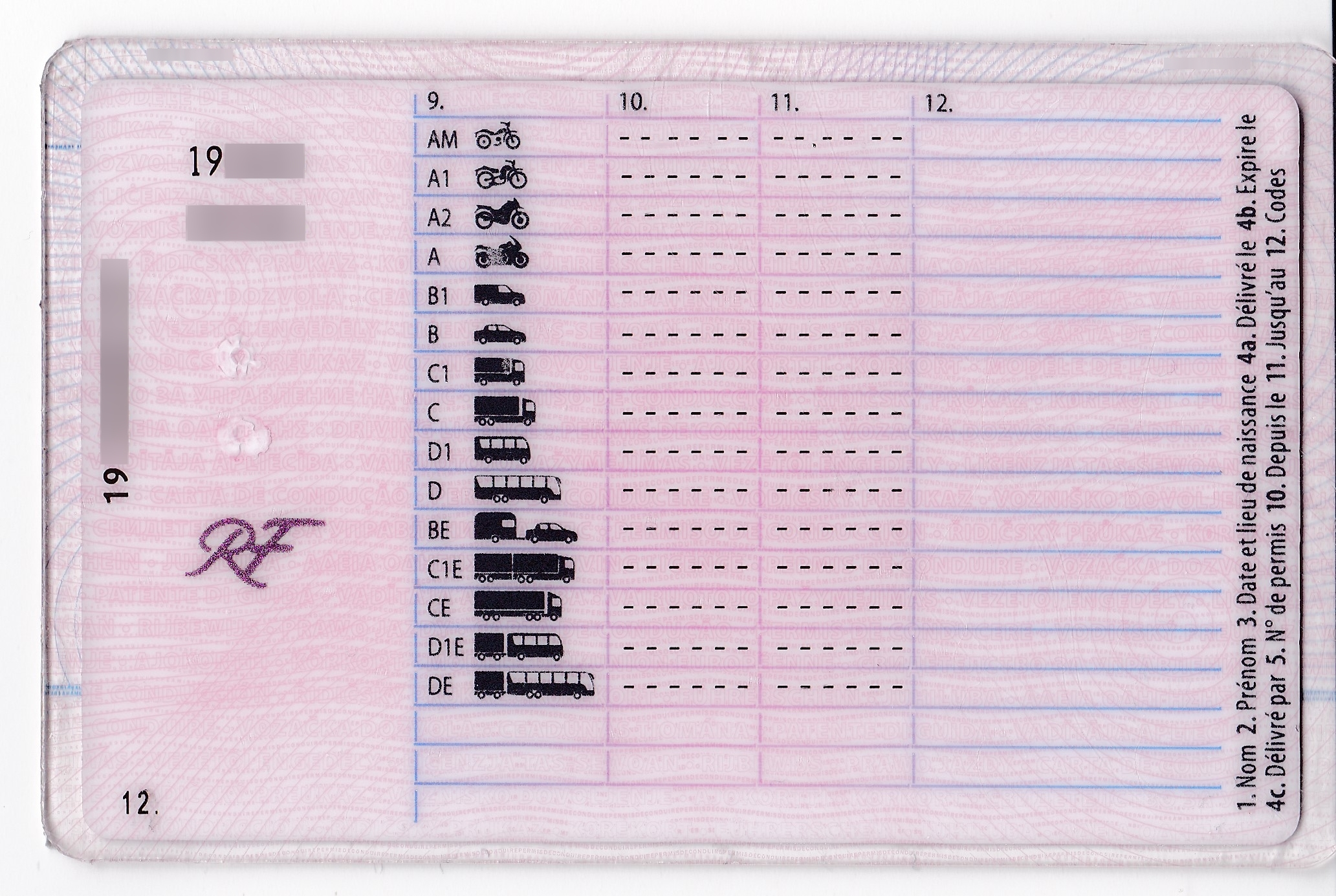
- Type: Driving licence
- Issued by: France (in Departments and Regions, including Saint Pierre and Miquelon)
- Purpose: Identification

In France, the driving licence (French: permis de conduire) is a governmental right given to those who request a licence for any of the categories they desire. It is required for every type of motorized vehicle. The minimum age to obtain a driving licence is fifteen years for a car, sixteen years for a motorcycle, and twenty-one years for buses and cargo vehicles.

Since 2013, the French driving licence format was changed from that of a pink booklet to a credit card-sized card. Some slight modifications appear on driving licences issued by some overseas collectivities such as French Polynesia, Saint Martin, and Wallis and Futuna. Licences from these collectivities are identical to the normal mainland format with the addition of the name of the collectivity next to “RÉPUBLIQUE FRANÇAISE” and, in the case of French Polynesia, the display of the regional flag on the bottom right part of the card. In 2015, Saint Barthélemy began issuing licences similar to those of Metropolitan France but with "SAINT BARTHÉLEMY" in place of “RÉPUBLIQUE FRANÇAISE”, without the yellow stars around the F, and with the Saint Barthélémy coat of arms in the background.

Since July 2023, New Caledonia joined other Overseas Collectivities, as well as the current French national driving licence by adopting a credit card sized licence. This new document features the French, Kanak and the EU flags, leading to some disapproval from certain political sectors on the territory. As of 2024, Wallis and Futuna remains the last French territory to issue non-credit sized driving licences.

A French driving licence is a European driving licence adhering to Directive 2006/126/EC and valid throughout the European Economic Area.

== Obtaining a driving licence ==
The French driving licence can be obtained after finishing driving school and passing a two-stage test: the written test (examen du code de la route) and the road test (examen pratique du permis). The code de la route exam consists of 40 questions, 35 of which must be answered correctly to pass. The test is in the French multiple choice style, in which several choices often need to be selected for a correct answer, and each test question may consist of sub-questions. The test consists mostly of photographs taken from the point of view of a driver, with road signs and mirrors clearly visible, or an external viewer or drone. Questions are presented both in text and audibly, and one has 20 seconds to answer each question once it has been read. After passing the exam, one can start taking driving lessons with their driving school. To take the road test, one must complete at least 20 hours of driving lessons.

== Graduated driver licensing ==
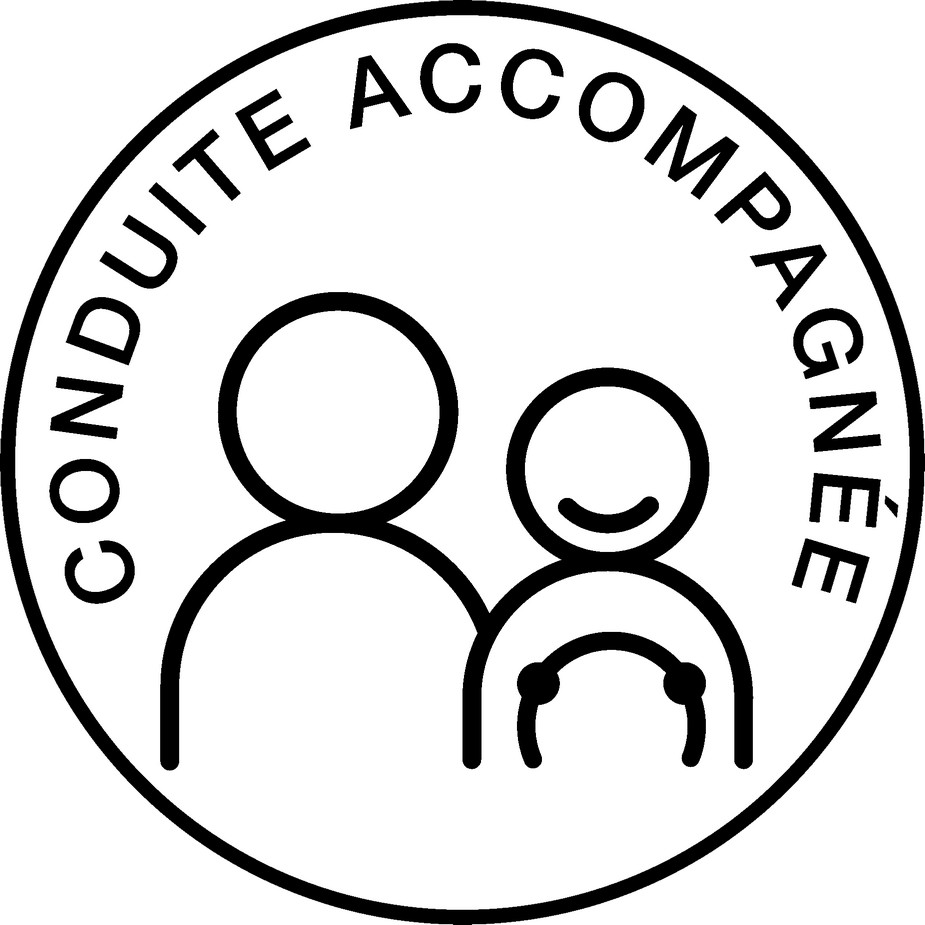
Disk on the rear of the car for vehicle with a learner.

France employs a graduated driver licensing (GDL) system for people between the ages of 15 and 17 and a half who hold a B category driving licence. Some restrictions exist, one of the main being that the learner must be accompanied by a driver who has held a licence continuously for at least 5 years.

The GDL is valid only within France, meaning that it would not be legal for a youth with a GDL to drive across an international border.

At the age of 18, one holding a learner's permit can apply for a normal driving licence. The pros to this are that the learner can pass more easily due to having had prior experience driving, and the probationary period for their new licence is reduced from three to two years.

For people over 18 applying for a licence for the first time, a system similar to the GDL exists, but rules are slightly different. For instance, it does not provide the reduction from three to two years for the probation licence.

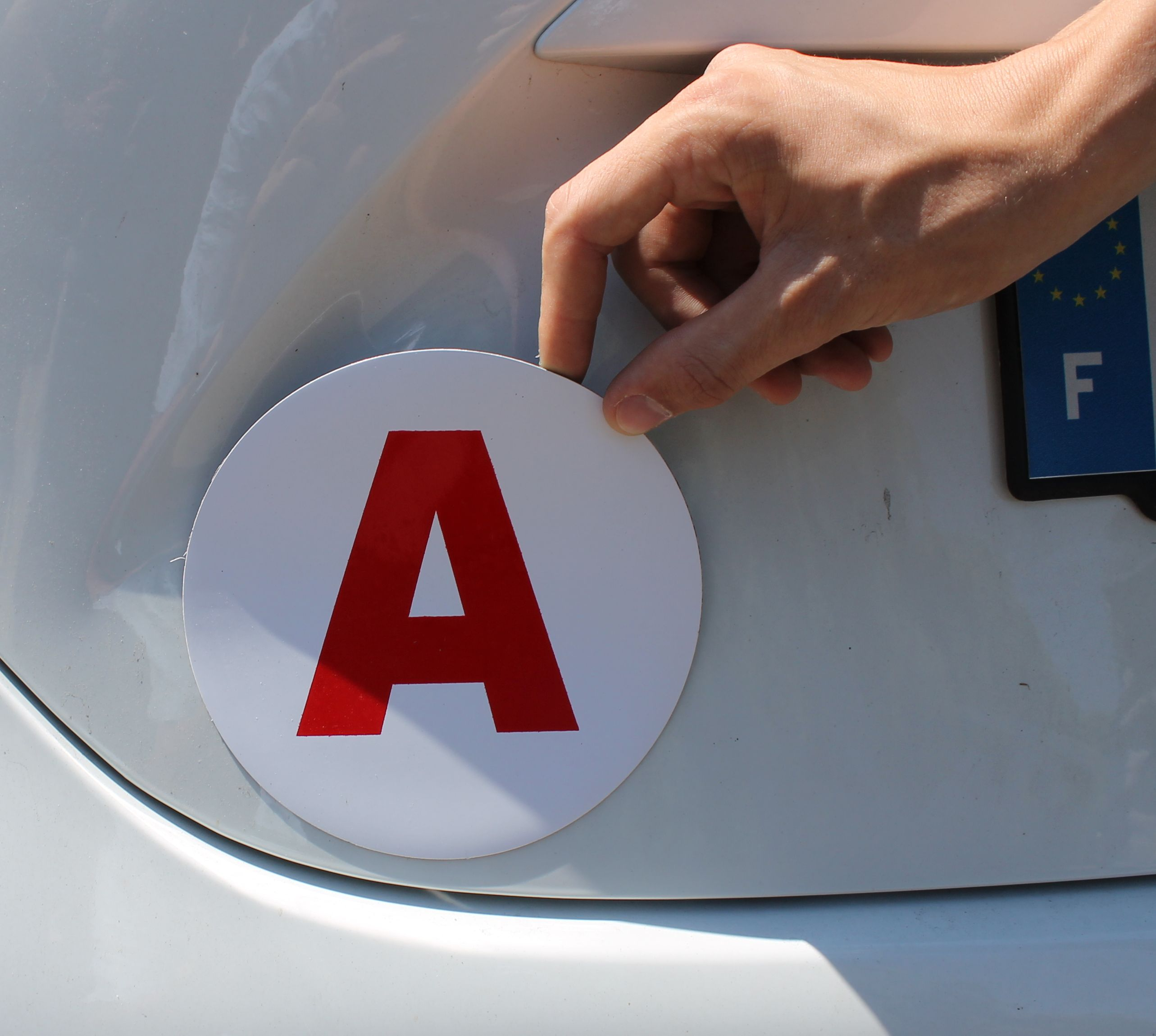
Magnetic A disk.

Furthermore, any person who initially gets a driving licence for the first time has to mind the following restrictions for two or three years, which period is known as the permis probatoire:

- New drivers may not drive as fast as seasoned drivers: 110 km/h instead of 130 on motorways, 100 km/h instead of 110, and 80 instead of 90 on rural roads.
- The symbol A should appear on the rear of the car
- The permis probatoire has only six points, the driver will have access to 12 points when they pass a three-year term

Points
When	général case	apprentissage anticipé case
Driving licence passed	6	6
After one year	+2 → 8 (if no point loss)	+3 → 9 (if no point loss)
After two years	+2 → 10 (if no point loss)	+3 → 12 (if no point loss)
After three years	+2 → 12 (if no point loss)	

If points are deducted due to infractions, they may be recovered by attending traffic safety classes.

== Gallery of historic images ==
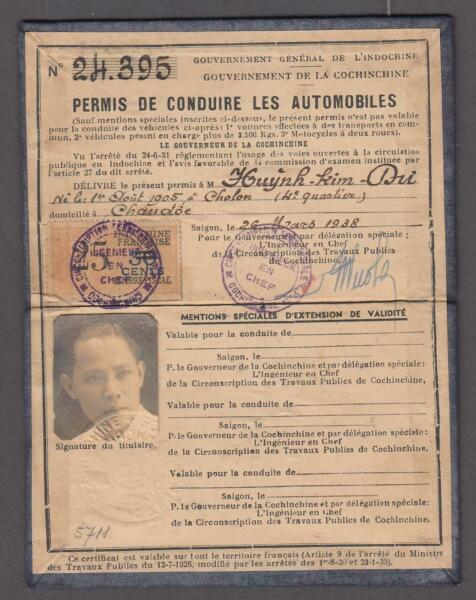
A colonial French driver's licence issued in Saigon, Cochinchina, French Indochina that was valid throughout all French territories (1938).

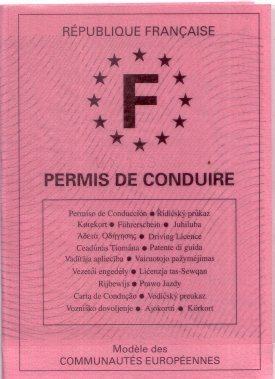
Old French driving licence (Replaced 2013)

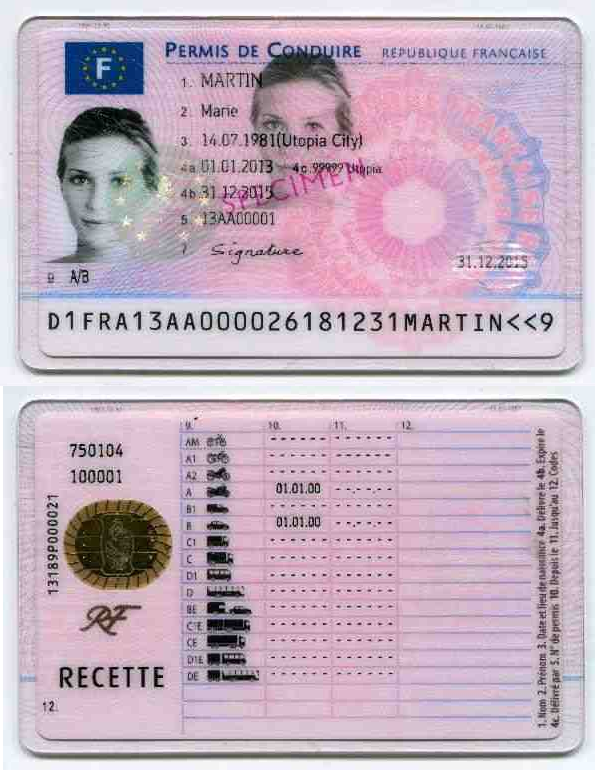
French driving licence issued from 2013 to 2015

== See also ==
- Early driver training in France
- European driving licence
- Vehicle registration plates of France
- French identity card
- French passport
