= Learner's permit =

Restricted license

A learner's permit, driver's permit, student permit, learner's license or provisional license is a restricted license that is given to a person who is learning to drive, but has not yet satisfied the prerequisite to obtain a driver's license. Having a learner's permit for a certain length of time is usually one of the requirements (along with driver's education and a road test) for applying for a full driver's license. To get a learner's permit, one must typically pass a written permit test, take a basic competency test in the vehicle, or both.

== Australia ==
Laws regarding learner's permits in Australia differ between each state. However, all states require a number of hours supervised driving to be undertaken and for the permit to be held for a set period. The age to get a Learner Permit is 16 in all states and territories except the ACT where it is 15 and 9 months. When a person is on their learner's permit, they have to log 50–120 hours depending on the state they are in and must obtain at least 5-20 night hours. They can be supervised or taught in their log book hours by any person/persons holding a full license. They must sign the log book for allocated hours. Learner drivers must display an 'L' plate on their car and have a 0% Blood alcohol content(BAC). Some states, do provide online applications to log these hours digitally. Upon passing the practical test, drivers are provided with a provisional licence ('P' plate) that enforces some restrictions on them for between 2 and 3 years.

== Belgium ==
A provisional learners license can be obtained after passing a theoretical exam less than three years prior. The minimum age for a learners permit is 15 years of age. The learner needs to be accompanied by a designated person with a valid driving license. The vehicle needs to bear a clearly visible, predesignated "learners" sign, sporting the letter "L".

If the learner goes to a driving school and follows 20 hours of lessons, he or she gets another learner's permit. With this, he or she can drive with maximum two people who have had their driver's license for at least 8 years, or the learner can drive by him/herself, but with some restrictions: the learner cannot drive between 10 p.m. and 6 a.m. on Fridays, Saturdays and Sundays; and the learner cannot drive on the evenings before a legal holiday, or the evening of the holiday itself.

== Canada ==
The minimum age to get a learner's licence in Canada varies from 14 in Alberta to 16 in all other provinces, with the minimum age being 15 in the territories.

=== Ontario ===
A G1 Licence is issued to new drivers at the age of 16 after completing a written test. G1 license restrictions include the following:

- The driver must maintain a blood alcohol level of zero at all times.
- Each passenger must wear a seatbelt.
- No driving between the hours of midnight and 5 a.m.
- Driving on the following highways are forbidden, unless accompanied by a licensed driving instructor:
  - 400-series highways
  - Queen Elizabeth Way (QEW)
  - Don Valley Parkway
  - Gardiner Expressway in the Greater Toronto Area (GTA)
  - E.C. Row Expressway in Windsor
  - Conestoga Parkway in Kitchener-Waterloo
- The driver must be accompanied by a fully licensed driver who has at least 4 years driving experience and a blood alcohol level of zero.

=== Nova Scotia ===
A beginner's permit (L) is issued to new drivers in Nova Scotia who are 16 years of age or older, after the person passes a written test. The L license restrictions include:

- A fully licensed driver must sit in the seat adjacent the new driver
- There cannot be additional passengers
- The learner must have a blood alcohol count of 0
- No time or road restrictions

=== Alberta ===
A Class 7 licence is issued to those who are 14 years of age or older and complete a knowledge test and eye exam. They are then put into a graduated driver licensing program with restrictions. These restrictions include:

- No driving between the hours of midnight and 5 a.m.
- A fully licensed driver must be in the passenger seat at all times.
- Having a blood alcohol level of zero.
- No more people than there are seat belts.
- Drivers are allowed a maximum of 8 demerit points.

Drivers with the Class 7 GDL licence must hold said license for one year before upgrading at which point a driver will be able take a road test if they are 16 years of age or older. If they pass, they become eligible to upgrade their licence to a Class 5 GDL. A Class 5 GDL licence carries some of the same restrictions as the Class 7 licence, but no longer requires a fully licensed Class 5 non-GDL driver in the passenger seat. Once the person becomes 18 and holds the Class 5 GDL license for at least 2 years, they can transition their licence to a full class 5 licence without having to take a road test again.

== France ==
In France, there is a graduated driver licensing program for people between the ages of 15 and 17 and half, for the B driving licence. There are some restrictions: for instance, a fully qualified driver must accompany the learner.

At age 18, the learner's permit can apply to a normal driving license, that it can pass more easily due to its previous experience; additionally, the length of the probation period (or permis probatoire) is lowered to two years.

This graduated driver licensing is valid only within France; thus one cannot use it to cross borders.

For people over 18, there is a system similar to Graduated driver licensing, but the rules are slightly different: for instance there is no reduction from three to two years for the probation licence.

Furthermore, once receiving a full driving license for the first time, the following restrictions apply for two or three years, known as permis probatoire:

- Maximum speed 110 km/h instead of 130 on motorways, 100 km/h instead of 110, and 80 km/h instead of 90 on rural roads.
- The permis probatoire has only six points while the regular permit has 12 points.
- At the end of the two or three-year period, assuming the driver made no infraction, the "permis probatoire" is automatically converted to a regular driver's licence.

Points
When	General case	Apprentissage anticipé case
Driving licence passed	6	6
After one year	+2 → 8 (if no point loss)	+3 → 9 (if no point loss)
After two years	+2 → 10 (if no point loss)	+3 → 12 (if no point loss)
After three years	+2 → 12 (if no point loss)	

Some training to road traffic safety might help to recover points.

== Germany ==
Germany does not issue a Learner's Permit and does not allow driving lessons other than with a fully licensed driving instructor. The minimum age for a Class B driving license for private cars is 18 years. However, obtaining a provisional driving license is possible for anyone aged 17 after receiving full training in a driving school and passing both the regular theory and on-the-road test. Until the young drivers reach the age of 18, they must be accompanied in the car by an experienced license holder. This regulation is called BF17 (Begleitetes Fahren, accompanied driving), see Graduated driver licensing.

== Hong Kong ==
In Hong Kong, any person aged 18 or above can apply for a Learner's Driving License for private cars, light goods vehicle and motorcycles. For other types of vehicle, the age required is 21 and the applicant must have a valid private car or light goods vehicle full driving license for 1 year, or have such full driving license issued after the completion of the respective probationary driving period. Unlike other jurisdictions, a learner must be supervised by an approved driving instructor instead of an ordinary fully licensed driver, or attending an approved driving school to learn to drive (except motorcycles, which learners can drive on their own, but motorcycle learners must pass a motorcycle course from an approved driving school before they can learn to drive on road). L-plate is also required when the learner is practicing.

== India ==
In India, the minimum age to obtain a provisional driving licence is 18 (for motorcycles and scooters). When driving with a provisional licence, the learner must be accompanied by a fully licensed driver. The supervisor must have a clear view of the road and be in a position to control the vehicle if necessary.

The provisional licence is issued only after passing a theory test. A full driving licence can be obtained after successfully completing the practical driving test. While it is possible to take both tests in quick succession, most learners take time between the theory and practical exams to undergo driving lessons—either with their supervisor or through a professional driving school.

Vehicles driven by learners must display L-plates on both the front and rear. These plates alert other road users that the driver is still in training and may make mistakes. The L-plate consists of a white square with a large red "L" in the center.

== Ireland ==
In Ireland, a learner may take the theory test at the age of 16, which assesses their knowledge of traffic situations and road signs. Upon passing this test, the learner receives a learner's permit, which allows them to drive on public roads when accompanied by a fully licensed driver who has held their licence for more than two years.

The main restrictions are that the learner cannot drive on motorways and must display 'L' plates clearly at all times. Additionally, they must hold the learner's permit for at least six months before they are eligible to take the practical driving test to obtain a full licence. This requirement is known as the "six-month rule."

== Italy ==
In Italy, anyone aged 14 or older can apply for a driving license (patente di guida). For a Category B license, which is available from age 18, the applicant must first pass a theory test covering topics such as traffic scenarios, road signs, insurance, and penalties. They have two attempts to pass this test.

Upon passing, the applicant receives a learner's permit (foglio rosa, literally "pink sheet" due to its color), which allows them to drive on public roads if accompanied by a licensed driver who has held their license for at least ten years. There are no restrictions on the vehicle's horsepower at this stage, although limits apply during the first three years after obtaining a full license, unless the newly licensed driver obtains a Category BE license.

Learners are allowed to drive on motorways and must display 'P' stickers (for Principiante, meaning beginner) on both the front and rear of the vehicle. They then have twelve months to take the practical driving test. If they fail to pass the road test within this period—also with two attempts spaced one month apart—they must obtain a new foglio rosa and pay the associated fees.

== New Zealand ==
=== Learner licence ===
In New Zealand, any eligible person 16 years or over can sit a learner licence test for a class 1 vehicle (car) or class 6 vehicle (motorbike), which is a theory multiple choice test on road rules. Once they have passed the learner licence test and received their licence in the mail, they may drive with an adult who has had their full licence of the same class for at least two years (a 'supervisor'). They may carry passengers with a supervisor in the car, but learner motorcyclists may not carry a pillion passenger. They must display L plates at all times when driving and may observe the posted speed limits.

=== Restricted licence ===
After at least 6 months have passed, they must pass a practical test to receive their restricted license. On a restricted license, the learner may only drive between 5 am - 10pm, with no passengers other than their dependent children, spouse or someone for whom they are the primary caregiver; they may drive at any time when accompanied by a supervisor. Learners who sit the practical test in an automatic car are only legally allowed to drive an automatic while on the restricted licence. If a driver has successfully completed an approved defensive driving course, the wait time between passing the restricted licence practical test and taking the full licence practical test is reduced from 18 months to 12 months.

== Norway ==
In Norway, the learner may drive as long the learner is over 16 years of age, have passed a basic course in the rules of the road and first aid, and a person 25 or above who has had their driver's license for more than 5 years is present.

== Singapore ==
In Singapore, any persons aged 18 or above may obtain a provisional driving licence for a fee of S$25.00 after passing the Basic Theory Test. The provisional driving licence is valid for 6 months if the PDL licence is obtained before 1 December 2017. From 1 December 2017, the validity of a PDL licence is 2 years from the date of payment, with no change of cost. It permits the holder to drive on public roads (with a few exceptions) in the presence of a Certified Driving Instructor. A car driven by a learner must display an L-plate on the front and rear of the car. Passing the Final Theory Test enables a learner to apply for the Practical Driving Test and it is valid for 2 years. A valid provisional driving licence, passed FTT and a photo ID must be presented to be allowed to take the practical test. Should a learner's provisional driving licence expire before the date of their practical test, he or she will have to renew it at the same cost. Expired PDL are not accepted and taking the practical tests will be rejected.

A Qualified Driving Licence (QDL) is awarded to a person who has passed the practical test and made a one-time payment of S$50.00. Any person who has possessed a QDL for a period of less than a year is required to display a probation plate at the top right of their front and rear windscreens. The probation plate is made of a reflective material and consists of an orange triangle on a yellow background. Failure to do so may cause the offending driver to receive a fine for the first time and then subsequently revoked from driving. See Driving licence in Singapore for detailed requirements of each class of licence.

== South Africa ==
A South African learner's license consists of three sections with the following criteria required:

- Rules of the road - There are 28 questions in this category with 22 being the pass mark
- Vehicle controls - There are 8 questions in this section, the required pass mark is 6
- Road signs, road markings and traffic signals - There are 28 questions in this category with a pass mark of 23

There are primarily three codes to choose from:

- Code 1 - This is for motorcycles, motorised tricycle or quadricycle not more than 125cc and the driver should be 16 or older on the date of the test. If the motorcycle engine in above 125cc, the driver will need to be 17 years or older.
- Code 2- This is for motor vehicles, bus and minibus or goods vehicle up to a maximum vehicle mass of 3500 kg. The driver will need to be 17 years or older on the date of the test.
- Code 3 - This is for motor vehicles exceeding a gross vehicle mass of 3500 kg. The driver will need to be 18 years or older to apply for a learners license in this category.

The following documents will need to be presented when applying for a learners license:

- Identity card or passport
- 2 Recent passport size photographs (colour or black and white)

In South Africa, any person who is of the minimum required age and holds a valid ID document may sit a learner's licence exam. The minimum required age varies by vehicle class and has the following minimum age restrictions:

- for a motorcycle (without a sidecar) with an engine not exceeding 125 cc – 16 years
- for light motor vehicles with a mass not exceeding 3 500 kilograms – 17 years
- for all other vehicles (also motorcycles with an engine exceeding 125 cc) – 18 years

The Learner's Licence exam is a 64 question multiple choice exam with questions spread over three sections: Rules of the road (28 questions); Signs, signals and road markings (28 questions), and vehicle controls (8 questions). The holder of a learner's licence is allowed to drive only when supervised by a licensed driver. If the category of vehicle being driven requires a professional driving permit, the licensed driver must also hold a professional driving permit. South African Learners must carry their Learner's Licence with them whenever they are driving a vehicle and have L plates on the rear window. The Learner's Licence is valid for 24 months.

== Sweden ==
In Sweden, the minimum age is 16 years old to get a basic car learner's permit; 17 years and six months are required for more advanced light vehicle combinations and up to 23 years for heavy vehicle combinations. Körkortslag 4kap 2§ A Swedish Learner's permit does not require a test, but only allows practising with a teacher. The teacher, including a private teacher such as a parent, must also have a permit. After a successful test, a real driver's license is given with a probationary period of two years. During this period, serious traffic violations that would lead to a suspension of the driver's license such as excessive speeding or gross reckless driving would instead revoke the driver's license. Restoration of the driver's license requires all tests to be retaken.

== Thailand ==
In Thailand, the minimum age is 18 years old to obtain a temporary driving licence for cars and motorcycles, valid for 2 years. For motorcycles 110 cc or smaller, the minimum age is 15. A temporary driving licence holder may drive without supervision, but cannot apply for an International Driving Permit.

After holding the temporary driving licence for at least 1 year, the licence holder may apply for a full 5-year driving licence for the same type of vehicle (2-year car => 5-year car or 2-year motorcycle to 5-year motorcycle). A medical certificate and a physical evaluation of visual and reaction time are required. This process is commonly called "two to five" meaning a conversion of a two-year to a five-year licence, as opposed to a renewal of a full licence, "five to five". In the event a temporary small motorcycle licence is set to expire while the holder is younger than 18, the new licence will be a two-year temporary licence.

If the temporary licence has expired for one year, a written examination is required. In case of three years or longer, a practical exam and a lecture are also required.

== United Kingdom ==
In the United Kingdom, the minimum age at which a provisional licence is valid is 17 (16 for driving a tractor, riding a moped or those receiving Disability Mobility Allowance). When driving under a provisional licence, the learner must be accompanied by a driver who has held a full driving licence for three years, and who is 21 or over.

The supervisor has to be in view of the road, however the Road Traffic Act 1988 states that the supervisor does not have to be in the passenger seat, although the passenger in the front seat does have to be over the age of 15. A full licence can be acquired as soon as the provisional licence is received, unlike many other countries where applicants must wait a minimum of 6–12 months before getting a full license. The provisional licence is available without taking a test, although to get a full, unrestricted licence, the applicant must take a written 'Theory' test containing fifty multiple choice questions and a fourteen-clip hazard perception test, both of which are done on a computer at one of the many DVSA (Driving and Vehicle Standards Agency) Test centres. Once the learner has passed the theory test, they may take the practical driving test; however the practical driving test has to be passed within 2 years of completing the theory test, as the theory test certificate expires 2 years after receiving it. Once the practical driving test has been passed, a full driving licence will be automatically issued. One can take the practical test immediately after the theory test, but most learner drivers take some time between them to take driving lessons, usually with a professional driving instructor.

A vehicle being driven by a learner driver must be fitted with L-plates on both the back and front of the vehicle. These tell other road users that the vehicle is being operated by a driver without a full licence and that they may make mistakes easily and that the driver may not be fully competent yet. The L-plate consists of a white square plate (often tied to the vehicle or attached by magnets) with a large red L in the middle. (In Wales a D-plate (D for dysgwr, Welsh for "learner") may be used instead of an L-plate.) If the vehicle is operated by multiple named drivers (as specified by the car insurance policy), then the L-plate should be removed while the car is being driven by a holder of a full licence. When the learner has passed the test, they can display a non-compulsory 'P' plate, which shows that they have just passed their test, and so may not have much experience on the road. The P plate has a white background, with a green 'P'.

In the UK, provisional licence holders are not allowed to drive on motorways unless accompanied by a driving instructor and in a car fitted with dual controls.

After gaining a full licence, the driver is subject to a probationary period: six or more penalty points accumulated within two years of passing the test would lead to a revocation of the licence, and both tests would need to be retaken.

In Northern Ireland for one year after the passing of a driving test, the driver is defined as a "restricted driver" who must not exceed 45 mph (72 km/h) and must display an "R-plate" consisting of an amber sans-serif R on a white background.

== United States ==
In the United States, all states and Washington D.C. have graduated driver's license programs for teenage drivers. Although the specific requirements vary by state, in a typical program a minor must first obtain a learner's permit and meet specific requirements to qualify for an intermediate driver's license, before ultimately becoming eligible for a full driver's license.

=== Learner's permits ===
For a minor to receive a learner's permit, sometimes called an instructional permit, states typically require that the minor have at least 6 practice hours before getting the permit and signed permission from a parent or guardian. In the state of New Hampshire, a permit is not given but the young driver may begin to drive with a parent or guardian, or an adult 25 years of age, at the age of 15 and a half.

Typically, a driver operating with a learner's permit must be accompanied by an adult licensed driver who is at least 21 years of age or older and in the passenger seat of the vehicle at all times.

After a legally defined period of driving supervised with a permit, usually between six and twelve months, and upon reaching the requisite age, the holder of a learner's permit can apply for a provisional license. Obtaining a provisional license allows certain restrictions to be lifted from the driver, such as the times that they are allowed to drive, and the number of people allowed in the car.

Some states require the permit holder to document specific hours of driving under the permit before qualifying for an intermediate license, such as fifty hours of practice.

=== Intermediate license ===
An intermediate or provisional license allows the driver to drive a vehicle without supervision by a licensed driver. Driving is typically permitted during a limited range of mostly daylight hours, as well as to and from school, work and religious activities. Some states may require a road test before allowing a learner's permit holder to obtain an intermediate license.

To qualify for a provisional license the applicant must typically be at least the age of 16 and must have previously held a learner's permit for at least six months. These requirements vary by state. For example, in Florida the prior period for holding a learner's permit is twelve months.

In many states, the period of driving on a learner's permit is shortened if the applicant is above the age of eighteen. For example, in Oklahoma if a driver is 18 or older a learner's permit must only be held for one month before the driver qualifies for an intermediate license. Some states allow drivers over the age of twenty-one to bypass the entire graduated licensing process. For example, in Colorado, a driver over the age of twenty-one may apply for and pass the tests for a permit and a full driver's license on the same day and, if successful in passing the tests, may obtain a full driver's license as soon as the driver passes a scheduled driving test.

Intermediate drivers are normally restricted in their transportation of passengers, especially minor passengers, without supervision.
