= Graduated driver licensing =

System to gradually certify new drivers

Graduated driver licensing (also known as GDL) systems are designed to provide new drivers with experience and skills gradually over time, reducing the risk of serious injury or death.

In traditional driver licensing systems, new drivers typically progress through three stages:

1. learner's permit
2. probationary or provisional license
3. full driver's license.

GDL systems often impose restrictions on nighttime driving, expressway usage, and unsupervised driving. However, these restrictions are typically lifted over time and with additional testing, eventually concluding with the individual obtaining a full driver's license.

== Overview ==
Acquiring a learner's permit typically requires meeting a minimum age requirement and passing vision and written knowledge tests. These tests usually assess the participant's knowledge of the rules of the road, hypothetical situations (e.g. junctions, speed limits, traffic signs, etc.), and hazard awareness while on the road. Parental or legal guardian permission may be required for applicants below a specified age. Learner's permit holders must typically drive under the supervision of a qualified licensed driver. They must remain free from both alcohol and drugs while driving, and they may be subject to speed limits and road restrictions. There may also be limits imposed on the number of passengers in the vehicle, and learner drivers may be required to be free of moving violations and at-fault accidents or crashes for a minimum period before moving to the next stage. In many jurisdictions, vehicles operated by learning drivers are required to display adequate signage to indicate supervised driving training. Learner drivers may also be required to complete a logbook of their driving experience, which must be certified or countersigned by a supervising driver or driver trainer.

The transition from a learner's license to an intermediate, provisional, or probationary license typically requires a minimum age and usually requires the learner driver to pass an on-road driving test, although in some jurisdictions there may be alternative licensing paths offered involving a continuous process of competency-based training and assessment under the guidance and instruction of an accredited driver trainer.

Those who receive an intermediate, provisional or probationary license may drive without supervision, although driving at certain times (typically after midnight until around sunrise) and driving with passengers in the vehicle may require the presence of a supervising driver who is fully licensed. Drivers typically must remain free of moving violations and at-fault accidents for a specified period of time. In some places, drivers with these licenses must have no alcohol or other drugs in their blood while they are driving and may be restricted to certain maximum speeds and from using mobile phones. In some jurisdictions, an intermediate, provisional, or probationary driver is required to display a P sign on the outside of the vehicle to indicate to other road users and police of their license status (and hence of restrictions that may apply).

Receipt of a full driver's license typically requires a specific minimum age, a minimum time period of driving experience, and may require the passing of a final road test of driving skills or the passing of a hazard perception test.

The first graduated driver licensing systems involving a learner licensing phase, an intermediate provisional or probationary licensing phase, and full licensing were developed in New South Wales, Australia in 1966.

The advocacy of graduated driver licensing in North America is associated with Professor Patricia Waller of the University of North Carolina Injury Prevention Research Center and later the University of Michigan Transportation Research Institute, commencing in the 1970s.

North American graduated driver licensing systems emerged in the late 1980s and 1990s (and were heavily influenced by a revamped graduated licensing system introduced in New Zealand in the 1980s, itself based on Waller's writings), and have now been adopted in almost all US and Canadian jurisdictions. These systems place particular emphasis on passenger restrictions and night-time driving curfews for young drivers.

In contrast, the approach of European graduated driver licensing systems places much greater emphasis on the training experiences of learner drivers before solo driving, with a lesser focus on license restrictions at the intermediate, provisional, or probationary licensing phase. Young drivers in European graduated driver licensing systems are typically older, as minimum licensing ages are older than most other countries. As well, most learner driver experience is obtained through professional driving instructors rather than through ad hoc supervision.

The Australian approaches to graduated driver licensing reflect and extend the thinking underpinning the North American and European approaches, combining restrictions on young drivers with intensive training requirements but also adding significant enforcement (zero-tolerance for speeding, driving while impaired by alcohol or other drugs, and the use of mobile phones by young drivers) and penalty components (particularly the suspension of a driver's license for offenses, the impounding of motor vehicles, and opportunities to attend traffic offender intervention programs as part of the penalty process). As in Europe, minimum licensing ages in Australian graduated driver licensing systems are older than in the North American graduated driver licensing systems, and most learner drivers in Australia also receive driver training from professional driving instructors as well as practice under informal driving supervision. Critical features of the Australian graduated driver licensing systems are the mandatory display of L and P plates on the front and back of vehicles driven by learner drivers and provisionally licensed drivers, and the compulsory carriage of a driver's license which facilitates police identification of young drivers and their vehicles.

== Graduated licensing and insurance ==
The automobile insurance industry generally supports graduated licensing. However, some youth rights advocates have accused insurance companies of charging premiums to new and young drivers in GDL jurisdictions that are not substantially less than premiums in non-GDL jurisdictions, even though graduated licensing supposedly reduces the risk of accidents. This issue is generally restricted to jurisdictions with private auto insurance. Most state-run automobile insurance schemes do not discriminate on account of age or driving experience.

== Africa ==
=== South Africa ===
In South Africa, a time-based graduated licensing system is used. To attain a full driving license, an individual must first obtain a learner's license. The individual must be 16 to obtain a motorcycle learner's license; 17 years old to be able to attain a learner's license to operate a light motor vehicle, and 18 years old to be able to attain a learner's license to operate a heavy-duty motor vehicle. Once the learner's license is issued, the individual has two years to attain their full license. It is recommended that learner drivers secure the assistance of a qualified, professional driving instructor.

There are three different categories of learner licenses:

- Code 1: motorcycles with or without a sidecar
- Code 2: motor vehicles (except motorcycles) with gross vehicle mass of 3,500 kg (7,700 lb) or less
- Code 3: all vehicles (except motorcycles) with a gross vehicle mass exceeding 3500 kg, drivers will need to be 18 years of age or older

== Asia ==
=== Hong Kong ===
Hong Kong uses a graduated licensing system regardless of the driver's age. A new license of private cars (1), minivans (2) and motorcycles (3) uses provisional license system called Probationary Driving license, while the others have extra requirements upon licensing.

However, drivers already having No. 2 licenses for at least 3 years, with no less than two years of non-provisional driving license, may be exempted from the probation or No.1 license (but not vice versa).

Driver on probation must comply with a 12-month minimum restricted period. They must comply the following rule while driving on the respected vehicles

- Placing a proper white plate with red letter "P" in the front and rear of the vehicle
- The speed limit is 70 km/h (43 mph) or the road's speed limit, lower if applicable
- Cannot drive in the overtaking lane on highways
- Cannot carry passengers (for motorcyclists only)

The probation period will be extended for 6 months if mild driving regulations are violated, and the probation license voided for severe violations or two mild violations. This rule also applies while driving on vehicles not on probation.

For the licenses other than 1, 2, or 3, the applicant must comply all of the requirements below upon application, which are:

- Over the age of 21
- Is a Hong Kong permanent resident, or not subjected to any condition of stay
- Have been driven in Hong Kong or recognized area for 3 years for cars or minivans, and should have no less than 2 years for non-provisional driving license
- Have no designated traffic offence record for past 5 years
- Are fulfilled with other extra requirements, if any.

== Europe ==
=== France ===
There is an early driver training program in France known as Conduite Accompagnée (Accompanied Driving or Learner's Permit (lit. 'driving accompanied' or 'supervised driving')), allowing drivers from the age of 15 to drive accompanied after having passed the General Theory test (nicknamed "code").

=== Germany ===
In Germany, there are two elements of the graduated driver licensing scheme:

- At the age of 17, a new driver is allowed to drive accompanied by an experienced driver. The persons who are allowed to accompany the driver, typically the parents, are listed in the preliminary license. When the driver turns 18, the normal license is sent to the driver without any additional tests. The German term is "Begleitetes Fahren".
- Within the first two years of holding the license, there is a zero tolerance alcohol limit and a stricter penalization of traffic rule violations. Some violations will extend the probation time to four years. The German term is "Führerschein auf Probe"

=== United Kingdom ===
In the United Kingdom, one may apply for a provisional driver's license from the age of 15 years 9 months, provided one is a legal resident of Great Britain. In Northern Ireland, legal residents can apply for their provisional from 16 years and 10 months. There is no requirement to sit a theory test before applying for a license. Residents in Northern Ireland must apply through a separate system. Those holding a provisional driving license are permitted to learn to drive a car from the age of seventeen years, and sixteen years for a moped or light quad bike.

Holders of a provisional license must be supervised by someone who is over 21 and has held their full license for over 3 years. Provisional license holders in Northern Ireland must not exceed 45 mph. When a learner is driving a car, they must display a red "L" plate on the front and rear of the vehicle (or a "D" plate in Wales). Learner drivers of cars (but not motorcycles) may drive on motorways in Great Britain only when with an Approved Driving Instructor.

To progress to holding a full license, a driver must pass a multiple choice theory test on the Highway Code and a video Hazard Perception Test, both of which are taken on a computer under strict examination conditions. Once they have passed both of these tests, the driver can schedule a practical driving test and must pass this in order to be awarded a full license. There is no minimum hours requirement for learning to drive, nor a minimum time to hold a license. Once a learner has passed their driving test, they can drive unaccompanied on public roads. There is no probationary period for new drivers in Great Britain, but this is presently under debate and may change in the future.

An optional scheme called "Pass Plus" is available in Great Britain for new drivers after passing their practical driving test; with an aim of improving general driving skills, as many lack experience. This course requires driving in a range of conditions and on a variety of roads. It is not a legal requirement, but completion of the course can lead to reduced insurance premium costs for new drivers, however there is no final test as such. The Pass Plus scheme is not available in Northern Ireland.

In October 2024 the AA suggested that drivers aged under 21, who have just passed their tests, should be prevented from carrying passengers of a similar age for their first six months as drivers. Additionally, it suggested six penalty points for them not wearing a seat belt during the period.

==== Northern Ireland ====
In 2026, Northern Ireland introduced graduated driver licensing.

The period where individuals became required to display P plates, after a successful practical test increased from 12 months to 24 months. Restrictions on driving with a passenger at nighttime were placed on individuals younger than 24 years old for six months (with exemption for immediate family members).

The changes introduced a mandatory minimum learning period of 6 months after taking a theory test, before someone can take a practical test, a requirement to complete a programme of training by completing a logbook.

=== Sweden ===
In Sweden, one may apply for a provisional driver's license for personal automobiles from the age of 16 years, providing one has obtained and provided a report on one's medical status, filled out by oneself, and completed and provided an optical exam to the governing body of the Swedish Transport Agency. While one does not need to sit through a theoretical test to qualify, one must sit through a lecture at a licensed driver's school. If and when both the student and supervisor are licensed, the student may drive on public roads with both the supervisor and student having proof of them being licensed with them, and the car having a sign in the back saying "Övningskör" roughly meaning "practice driving", a green one if one is driving privately, most often with one's parent or guardian, or a red sign if the student is driving with an instructor from an official driving school.

While driving, the student must be accompanied by another fully licensed driver, who must be 24 years or older, have completed an introductions course that is good for personal automobiles within the last 5 years, their student must also have completed this course, and they must have had a fully-fledged driver's license for at least 5 years within the last 10 years.

=== Norway ===
In Norway, drivers must be above the age of 16 and accompanied by a person above the age of 25 who has had a driver's license for at least 5 years. In addition, the student must have passed a basic traffic course.

== North America ==
=== Canada ===
In Canada, each province is responsible for the transportation laws. Most provinces not listed have a system that resembles one of the following graduated licensing programs.

==== Alberta ====
In Alberta, one may obtain their Class 7 learner's license at 14 which is the beginning stage of the GDL Program. The GDL program lasts four years if the learner's license is obtained at 14, or three years if obtained at 15. The learner's license allows a new driver to drive only when accompanied. One must hold a learner's driver's license (class 7) for at least one year. Learner drivers must be accompanied by a fully licensed (non-GDL probationary) driver who is 18 years of age or older and is seated next to them. They are not permitted to drive from midnight to 5 a.m. or have more passengers than seat belts. Driving privileges will be suspended if the learner accumulates eight or more demerit points, and they must have zero level of alcohol and drugs when driving (or riding a motorcycle).

To obtain a probationary (restricted) license, a driver must be at least 16 years of age. They must pass the Alberta Class 5 basic road test. This license allows them to drive unsupervised and with no curfew restrictions, but there are still some conditions placed on their license that are similar to the learner's license. They must still have a zero blood alcohol content while driving, their license will be suspended if they accumulate eight or more demerit points, and they must hold this license for a minimum of two years. They also cannot be a supervising driver to someone with a learner's license and they will not be able to re-class their license to drive commercial vehicles.

To obtain an unrestricted license, a driver must be at least 18 years of age. In order to obtain this license successfully, they must pass the Class 5 Advanced Road Test, which is longer and tests more skills than the basic test. They must also be suspension-free for the last twelve months of the two-year probationary stage. One of the restrictions that are removed are the zero-tolerance rules for alcohol. The permissible blood alcohol limit for fully licensed drivers of legal drinking age, which is 18, is anything below 0.05%. Moderate sanctions are imposed on drivers who have a BAC between 0.05% and 0.08%, such as a three-day suspension of their license, and their vehicle can be impounded for three days with more severe sanctions for repeat offenders. Full criminal sanctions under the Canadian Criminal Code start at 0.08% or above. They can also qualify to drive Class 1, 2, 3, or 4 commercial vehicles and increase the demerit points they are allowed before suspension, which is from 8 to 15, and they can now supervise learner licensed drivers.

All new drivers must complete the GDL program regardless of age.

==== British Columbia ====
The Graduated Licensing Program (GLP) was introduced in British Columbia in 1998 and is based on driving experience. A driver who is at least 16 years old and has never driven before must first take a knowledge test and vision screening test to attain their Class 7L (Learner's) permit. Upon achieving this, they must be supervised by a full licensed driver of at least 25 years of age when driving. After a minimum of one year, they can take a practical driver's exam (road test). Upon succeeding the driver's exam, they receive their Class 7 N (Novice) license, which allows them to drive alone, but with several restrictions. After a minimum of two years of safe driving, they may take another practical driver's exam (Class 5 road test), and upon passing, they become a full licensed Class 5 driver.

Novice drivers may even be able to take their Class 5 road test after only 18 months, if they have taken an ICBC approved graduated licensing program during the L stage and have met all other requirements (no at-fault accidents, tickets, or driving prohibitions). By successfully completing this ICBC approved driving course, drivers are also eligible to receive two high school credits.

Drivers who have had experience driving outside the province must take the knowledge test and get their learner's permit, but they are allowed to upgrade their status to Novice after a minimum of one day. However, they must similarly wait a period of two years before attempting to gain their full license. This can apply even if the applicant currently holds an unrestricted license from another jurisdiction.

==== Ontario ====
In Ontario, the graduated licensing system is a time-based process. Once an individual turns 16, they are eligible to acquire a class G1 license, which is the beginning stage. This is done by passing both a knowledge test, as well as a vision test. The G1 license is required by law to be held for 12 months unless the licensee takes an approved Driver's Education course, by which the waiting time is dropped to 8 months. A holder of a G1 license may drive only with a G level (or higher) driver who has 4 years' experience, which includes time as a G2 driver. The G1 license carries other restrictions, such as a curfew and limiting which high-speed freeways the novice driver is allowed use. The accompanying driver must maintain their blood alcohol content (BAC) under 0.05. At the end of that period, the novice driver can take a G1 exit test demonstrating basic driving skills. Passing grants a G2 license which permits drive alone with a limited number of passengers in the vehicle unless certain requirements are met (note: the passenger limitation only applies to G2 drivers aged 19 and under between the hours of 12 AM and 5 AM).

G2 licenses are kept for 12 months and then he/she can take the G2 exit test, which tests highway driving as well as city driving skills. A G2 license holder is subject to a new set of restrictions, which are more relaxed than those for the G1 license: The driver must maintain a BAC of zero, and if the license holder is 19 years of age or under, time-specific passenger restrictions apply. Passing the G2 exit test grants the Class G license which is considered a full license in Ontario. This can apply even if the applicant currently holds an unrestricted license from another jurisdiction.

There are a few other graduated licensing systems in Ontario, including motorcycles (M1, M2, M) and since 2005, mopeds (for a non-class M license holder) (LM1, LM2).

=== United States ===
In the United States, transportation laws are the responsibility of the state governments. The federal government does, however, try to encourage graduated driver licensing through its National Priority Safety Programs fund. The National Transportation Safety Board reported in 2017 that zero dollars were expended on graduated driver licensing through this fund in 2016 (compared to more than $230 million for impaired driving campaigns).

In 2011, the Safe Teen and Novice Driver Uniform Protection (STANDUP) Act (S. 528, H.R. 1515) was introduced in the US Senate on March 9 by Senator Kirsten Gillibrand (D-NY) and in the US House of Representatives on April 14 by Representatives Tim Bishop (D-NY) and Randy Hultgren (R-IL). This legislation would establish minimum federal requirements for state graduated licensing laws.

==== Alabama ====
The State of Alabama uses an age-based graduated licensing system. A new driver over the age of 18 does not need to go through the graduated licensing process; they receive their full license after fulfilling requirements (tests and fees). A 15-year-old licensee must be accompanied by a licensed driver of 21 years of age or older. A 16-year-old licensee may be able to drive unsupervised with permission. However, between 12 am and 6 am, 16-year-olds need supervision unless performing necessary activities. According to the National Safety Council, other states follow similar types of restrictions.

==== Alaska ====
The State of Alaska issues new drivers an Instruction Permit at the age of 14 or older. This Instruction Permit has a validity period of 2 years with only one renewal possible. A special instruction permit may be issued to persons enrolled in an approved high school, community college, commercial driver training course, or approved medical program. With an Instruction Permit, a new driver may drive with a supervising driver who is 21 or over and has at least 1 year of experience in that type or class of vehicle. At the age of 16, a driver with an Instruction Permit may apply for a Provisional License. To obtain it, the driver must not have received a traffic conviction within the last 6 months. If the driver is under the age of 18, the driver must have had the Instructional Permit for 6 months prior to obtaining the Provisional License and have a parent, legal guardian, or employer certify the driver has had 40 hours of experience; 10 of those hours must be during, "progressively challenging circumstances".

If under the age of 18, a driver with a Provisional License is under the following restrictions:

- May not carry passengers unless one of the passengers is:
  - A parent
  - Legal guardian
  - At least 21 years of age.
- May carry passengers, without a parent in the vehicle, if they are siblings.
- May not operate a motor vehicle between the hours of 1:00 am and 5:00 am unless accompanied by
  - A parent
  - Legal guardian
  - A person at least 21 years of age who is licensed to drive the class of vehicle being used.
- May operate a motor vehicle between the hours of 1:00 am and 5:00 am to or from one's place of employment or within the scope of their employment and driving is along the most direct route.

The restrictions above do not apply if the driver has an "off system" license restricted to areas not connected to the land highway system or is not connected to a highway where average daily traffic volume is 499 or greater.
A driver may apply for a non-Provisional License if they are older than 18, have held a Provisional License for 6 months, have not received a traffic offence or been convicted on multiple instances of a minor consuming alcohol.

==== Arizona ====
The State of Arizona issues a Graduated Instruction Permit to new drivers at or over the age of 15 years 6 months; with a Graduated Instruction Permit the driver must be accompanied by a licensed driver at least 21 years of age. At 16 years old a driver can obtain a Class G (Graduated) Driver's License after completing 20 hours of daytime driving and 10 hours of nighttime driving, and holding a Graduated Instruction Permit for 6 months. A driver with a Class G Driver's License for the first 6 months cannot:

- Drive between midnight and 5 am unless
  - a parent or legal guardian with a valid Class A, B, C or D license is in the front passenger seat
  - is driving from or to a
    - sanctioned school sponsored activity
    - sanctioned religious activity
    - place of employment
    - family emergency
- Drive one or more passengers under the age of 18 unless
  - Passenger(/s) are the drivers sibling(/s)
  - a parent or legal guardian with a valid Class A, B, C or D license is in the front passenger seat

At 18 years old a Driver may apply for a Class D (non-Graduated) license.

==== Arkansas ====
The State of Arkansas uses an age-based graduated licensing system, drivers who start over the age of 18 are not required to have had a Learner's License or an Intermediate License and can get a Class D License after completing an Instruction Permit.

Instruction Permit
An applicant for an Instruction permit must be 14 years of age and complete a vision and knowledge exam. The Instruction Permit is valid for 1 year after the completion of the knowledge exam and cannot be renewed passed, once this permit has expired an applicant can then receive a Learner's License, Intermediate License or Class D license depending on age. With an Instruction Permit they must have a licensed driver and be at least 21 years old in the seat beside the driver.
Learner's License
An applicant can receive a Learner's License if they are between the ages of 14 and 16 and must have completed an Instruction Permit. With a Learner's License they must have a licensed driver of least 21 years old in the seat beside the driver.
Intermediate License
An applicant can receive an Intermediate License if they are between the ages of 16 and 18 and must have completed an Instruction Permit. A restriction is put in place if the applicant has not had a Learner's License for 6 months. If the applicant has not had a Learner's License a 6-month restriction or has not held a Learner's License for 6 months or more the difference is added as a restriction. The aforementioned restriction is that they must have a licensed driver of least 21 years old in the seat beside the driver. On the Driver's 18th birthday they can receive a Class-D License.

==== D.C. (District of Columbia) ====
If you are between 16 and 21 years old, DC DMV offers you a special license program to help you become a safe, experienced driver. The Graduated License Program (known as GRAD) gives novice drivers the support you need to improve your driving skills and graduate from learner permit, to provisional license, to a full DC DMV driver license.

==== Missouri ====
All first-time drivers between 15 and 18 years old must follow Missouri's Graduated Driver License law.

Instruction Permit
An applicant for an Instruction permit must be 15 years of age and pass a vision, road sign recognition, and written tests at a Missouri State Highway Patrol driver examination station. The applicant must then be accompanied by a guardian, or other qualified person to a license office to sign a permission form. The Instruction Permit is valid for 1 year after application at the permit office and can be renewed. People with an instruction permit may only drive when there is a qualified person in the car (parent, driving instructor, etc.)
Intermediate License
If the applicant has had an instruction permit for a minimum of 182 days, has received 40 hours of driving instruction; They may take a driving examination which if passed will earn them their Intermediate License. Intermediate License holders have restrictions when driving with people under 19 years of age in the car and restrictions on driving from 1 to 5 a.m.
Under 21 Full Driver License
Must be 18 years of Age, and must pass the vision and road sign recognition tests again. No special restrictions.

==== New Jersey ====
New Jersey residents who have never had a driver license must follow New Jersey's Graduated Driver License (GDL) program to get their first unrestricted basic driver license. The GDL is designed to give new drivers increased, step-by-step instruction and driving experience on the road to obtaining a basic driver license. The GDL has been proven to save lives among new drivers and their passengers.

==== West Virginia ====
In West Virginia, for drivers between ages 15 to 17 years old, they must get their license through the Graduated Driver's License System (GDL).

Instruction Permit (Level I GDL)
Once a teenager turns 15 years old, they are eligible to apply for the instructional permit. The only requirements is that the 15 year old must have a valid School Driver Eligibility Certificate from their school board, permission from their parent or legal guardian, and when driving they must have a licensed 21+ year old in the front seat at all times.
Intermediate License (Level II GDL)
After turning 16 and having over 50 hours of verified driver training after having the instructional permit for over 6 months, the driver may start the process of getting their intermediate license. Within three separate attempts, if the driver passes a road skills test, they get the intermediate license. License holders no longer need to drive with an adult, but still must drive between the hours of 5:00 am and 10:00 pm.
Full License (Level III GDL)
Once the driver turns 17 and has held their intermediate license for at least a year, they can apply for their full license. No driving restrictions under the full license.

== Oceania ==
=== Australia ===
Graduated Driver Licensing (GDL) first commenced in Australia in the mid-1960s with New South Wales introducing provisional licenses on 4 January 1966. Learner licenses had been in use since 1952. The provisional phase was for 12 months and had 40 mph speed restriction. Today in all Australian states, newly licensed drivers are required by law to display P-plates for varying lengths of time. The P is usually a red or green letter on a white background or a white letter on a red or green background (Victoria & Western Australia only). In New South Wales and Victoria there are two classes of provisional license, red P-plates are for the first year after passing the Learner test and then after passing a computerized test, they are green for two to three years. Western Australia requires six months of red P-plates, where provisional drivers are under a 12 am – 5 am curfew, and one and a half years of green P-plates.

On 1 July 2000, New South Wales introduced a three-stage Graduated Licensing Scheme (GLS).

- Stage one is a learner license with the requirement to complete 50 hours of supervised driving (increased to 120 hours 1 July 2007).
- Stage two is a one-year P1 probationary license (with red P plates).
- Stage three is a two-year P2 probationary license (with green P plates).

On 1 July 2010, Victoria introduced the Graduated Licensing Systems (GLS).

- Stage one is a one-year P1 probationary license (with red P plates).
- Stage two is a three-year P2 probationary license (with green P plates).
- P1 drivers are prohibited from using a mobile phone of any kind, are banned from towing, except for work or when supervised and can carry no more than one passenger aged between 16 years of age and less than 22 years, unless the passengers are immediate family members.

A good driving record will be necessary to progress to the next license stage.

As of July 2007, newly issued Queensland drivers licenses have new restrictions for those under 25. Learners must first log 100 hours of driving experience (of which 10 must be undertaken at night) before taking their practical driving examination. Learners can boost this experience by taking professional lessons which count for 3 times the hours, for up to 10 hours (or 30 logbook hours.) After a period of one year, provisional drivers must then pass a hazard-perception test to move from red to green P-Plates where previously only a 3-year duration was required. New restrictions also prevent any under-25, Queensland provisional license-holder from carrying more than one passenger under the age of 21, who is not an immediate family member, between the hours of 11 pm and 5 am.

=== New Zealand ===
New Zealand has had a graduated driver license system since 1987. The process of obtaining a full light vehicle driver license in New Zealand is:

1. Theory test at a minimum age of 16.
2. Learner license: 6 months
3. Practical test at a minimum age of 16 years 6 months
4. Restricted license: 12 months (with advanced driving course) or 18 months (without advanced driving course)
5. Practical test at a minimum age of 17 years 6 months or 18 years, depending on whether the driver passes an advanced driving course.
