= Early driver training in France =

French program aiming to help teenagers drive

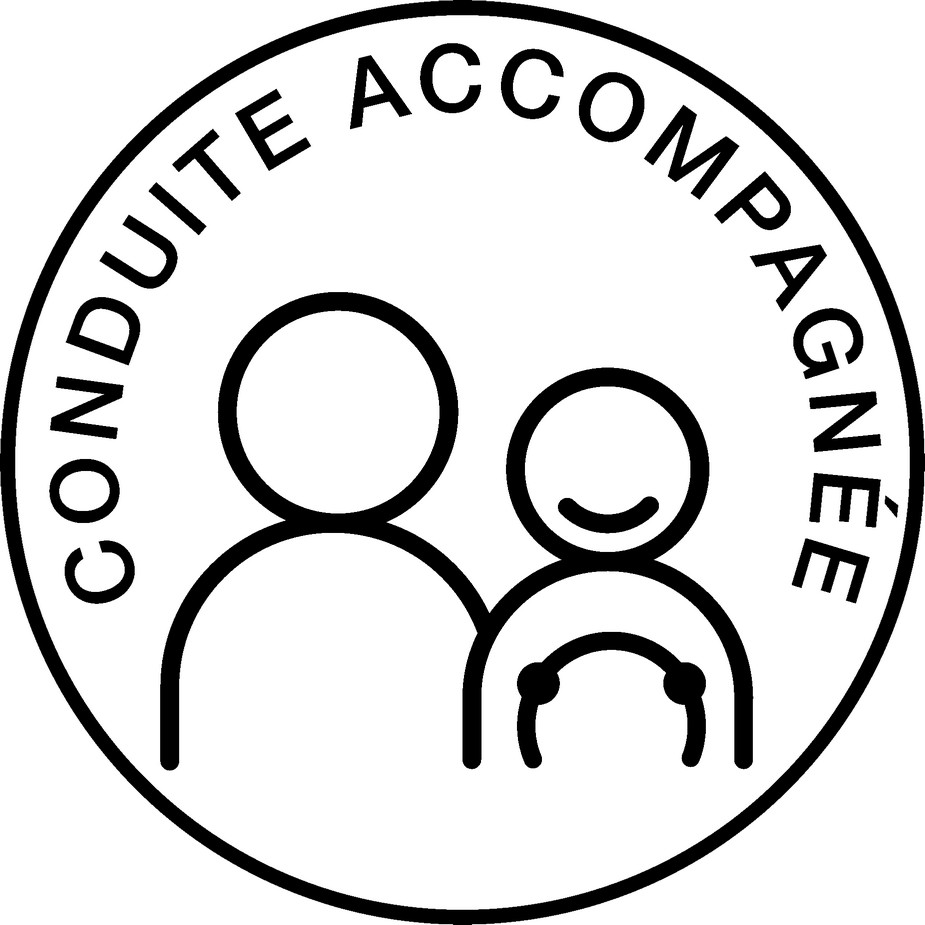
Disc to be affixed to the rear of vehicles under accompanied driving conditions.

The Apprentissage anticipé de la conduite - AAC (English: Early driver training), formerly known as “conduite accompagnée”, (Note: For road safety, the term "accompanied driving" now covers three systems: early learning to drive, supervised driving and supervised driving.) is a French training program that has been in existence since 1987. It aims to make it easier for fifteen-year-olds in France to learn to drive, to obtain a driver's license.

The principle of this training is to gradually acquire, over a long period, the experience, skills, and knowledge required to drive a Category B vehicle.

The learner learns the basics of driving at the driving school and then perfects technical skills under the supervision of an accompanying driver (usually a close relative, father, or mother), before taking the driving test. The advantage of this approach is that it has a higher success rate than conventional training (70% vs. 54% in 2007), mainly because the student gets more practice before taking the test.

== Prerequisites ==
=== Vehicle ===
The vehicle used for accompanied driving must have a rearview mirror on the left and right. It is forbidden to tow a trailer that requires a BE license.

A warranty extension for the AAC is compulsory. Acceptance of the contract extension is at the discretion of the insurer.

=== Escort ===
The accompanying driver must have held a Category B license for five years without interruption.

The accompanying driver should install a set of rearview mirrors on their car, to see both the sides and the rear of the vehicle. This will enable them to play their role more effectively and react more quickly to avoid an accident.

Several people can be designated as escorts, and their names must be mentioned on the contract between the student, the driving school, and the escort. The agreement of the insurer of the accompanying person(s) is required. However, the insurer may refuse if the driver has committed:

- Manslaughter or unintentional injury;
- Driving under the influence of alcohol;
- Hit-and-run;
- A refusal to obey;
- Driving while the license is suspended or revoked.

== Training ==
Training takes place in three stages: initial training, accompanied driving, and taking the test.

Before these three stages, the learner driver first undergoes the standard initial assessment, which will enable the number of hours of driving required to be determined (the minimum number is always 20 hours). This is a prediction, which can of course be modified according to the learner's progress during training.

=== Initial training ===
This is the classic driver's license training course, with objectives set out in the student's logbook.

==== General theory test (ETG) ====
Commonly referred to as the “code”, this test can be taken from the age of 15, and must be passed before the end of the initial training course. The ETG is valid for the practical test of the driving test five years after passing it.

Candidates enrolled in the early learning to drive program who have passed the theory test at the end of their initial training retain their eligibility for five practical tests. The code must be valid at the end of the training course and on the day of the practical test (no time limit is stipulated, but candidates who exceed the validity of their code by remaining in accompanied driving for longer will have to retake their theory test for the practical test). Eligibility remains unaffected in the event of a change of driving school, category, or sub-category.

The ETG training course and test are identical to those for the conventional route.

==== Practical training ====
Initial training is given in an approved driving school. It is identical point by point to that of a conventional driving license. The only difference from conventional training is the compulsory presence of a supervisor during the validation of the fourth stage.

The number of hours of driving, i.e. practical training, may not be less than 20 hours, including at least 15 hours on roads open to traffic, unless you are:

- Already hold another category of driving license (except categories AM and B1): there is no compulsory minimum number of hours, depending on how far you have progressed in your training;
- Taking a course limited to driving a vehicle fitted with an automatic gearbox: a minimum of 13 hours is required.

An additional two hours are required for a preliminary meeting with the instructor, during which the teacher gives advice.

The student's progress and achievements are logged in an AAC learning booklet. This document, usually blue and/or white and supplied by the school, must accompany the learner throughout the training program to authorize driving with an accompanying driver. The booklet functions as the learner's operational 'driving license' during both practical instruction and the supervised driving period.

It is the trainer who estimates and decides when the student is ready to begin the accompanied driving phase. The trainer issues a certificate of completion of the initial training. This certificate is contained in the AAC booklet; one copy remains in the booklet as proof of training, particularly in the event of a police check, one copy is sent to the school and a third copy, for the accompanying driver's car insurance, is given to the driver.

The best thing for the student is to complete the practical training quickly, to gain experience with the instructor rather than in paid lessons.

=== General information ===
A 2-hour appointment with the driving school's instructors is compulsory before the driving period.

The accompanied driving phase allows the student to drive under supervision. The accompany driver provides advice and instruction. During this phase, students perfect their technical skills, gain confidence, and become aware of special situations that are not taught in driving school. Regulations for accompanying drivers are the same as drivers behind the wheel, such as the possession of alcohol.

The learner must drive a minimum of three thousand kilometers over an indefinite period, on a variety of routes (until December 2009, this period was a minimum of one year and a maximum of three years from the date shown on the learner's booklet (attestation de fin de formation) at the end of initial training).

Accompanied driving must be carried out on a variety of routes (urban, road, freeway, and mountain), restricted to French national territory only.

The driver must respect the same restrictions on speed limits as novice drivers:

- 110km/h on freeway sections where the speed limit is 130km/h
- 100 km/h on other freeway sections
- 100 km/h on roads with 2 carriageways separated by a central reservation
- 50 km/h in built-up areas
- 80 km/h on roads limited to 90 km/h
- 80 km/h on other roads

These speeds remain unchanged in wet weather.

When visibility is less than 50 meters (fog, snowfall, heavy rain, etc.), the maximum speed is reduced to 50 km/h maximum on all types of road.

During the accompanied driving course, the learner must always keep their training booklet (with the certificate of completion of training) and the document proving the extension of insurance coverage. These documents must be produced in the event of an inspection by the police, in addition to the vehicle's papers and those of the accompanying driver. The learner must also have the addendum to the “Apprentissage anticipé de la conduite” learning booklet.

The AAC disc must be affixed to the lower left rear of the vehicle body during accompanied driving.

All journeys must be recorded in the logbook issued by the driving school, with details of the number of kilometers driven, the type of road, any difficulties encountered, etc., so that these can be discussed with the teacher during training sessions.

=== Teaching meetings ===
A prior 2-hour meeting is compulsory between the instructor in charge of training at the driving school, the accompanying person, and the student.

During the accompanied driving period, a minimum of 2 educational meetings between the training supervisor, the learner driver, and his/her supervisors must be organized, lasting three hours. This means 2 hours of theory (classroom sessions with a driving instructor on road safety topics) and 1 hour of practical driving (driver behavior assessment) within 6 months of the training completion certificate, and after the learner has driven 1,000 km. The second training appointment is the same as the first, i.e. 3 hours scheduled within two months, prior to the practical test (admission).

The purpose of these RVP (pedagogical meetings) is to confirm, advise, correct, or refocus the students, their errors, and uncorrected faults or clumsiness on the part of the supervisors.

An RVP consists of two phases:

- An in-traffic phase lasting a minimum of one hour, taking place between four and six months after the end date of the initial training course and after 1,000 km;
- An individual or group interview led by an instructor, focusing on the student's experience and road safety, takes place during the last two months of the accompanied driving period and after a minimum of 3,000 km.

An additional RVP can be set up in addition to the two minimum legal RVPs, at the initiative of the instructor, the student, or the accompanying driver, if the need arises.

=== Driving test ===
Once the student has passed the ETG, completed 20 hours of driving and 3,000 km, two training sessions, and a minimum of 6 months accompanied driving, he or she can take the traditional driving test from the age of 17 (with a duly completed “livret d'apprentissage”).

The test is similar to that of the conventional route: a driving course on roads in and outside built-up areas. The latter lasts 32 minutes, with one or two maneuvers (but always including reversing), two questions on checks (interior and exterior), and a first-aid question.

== Following licensing ==
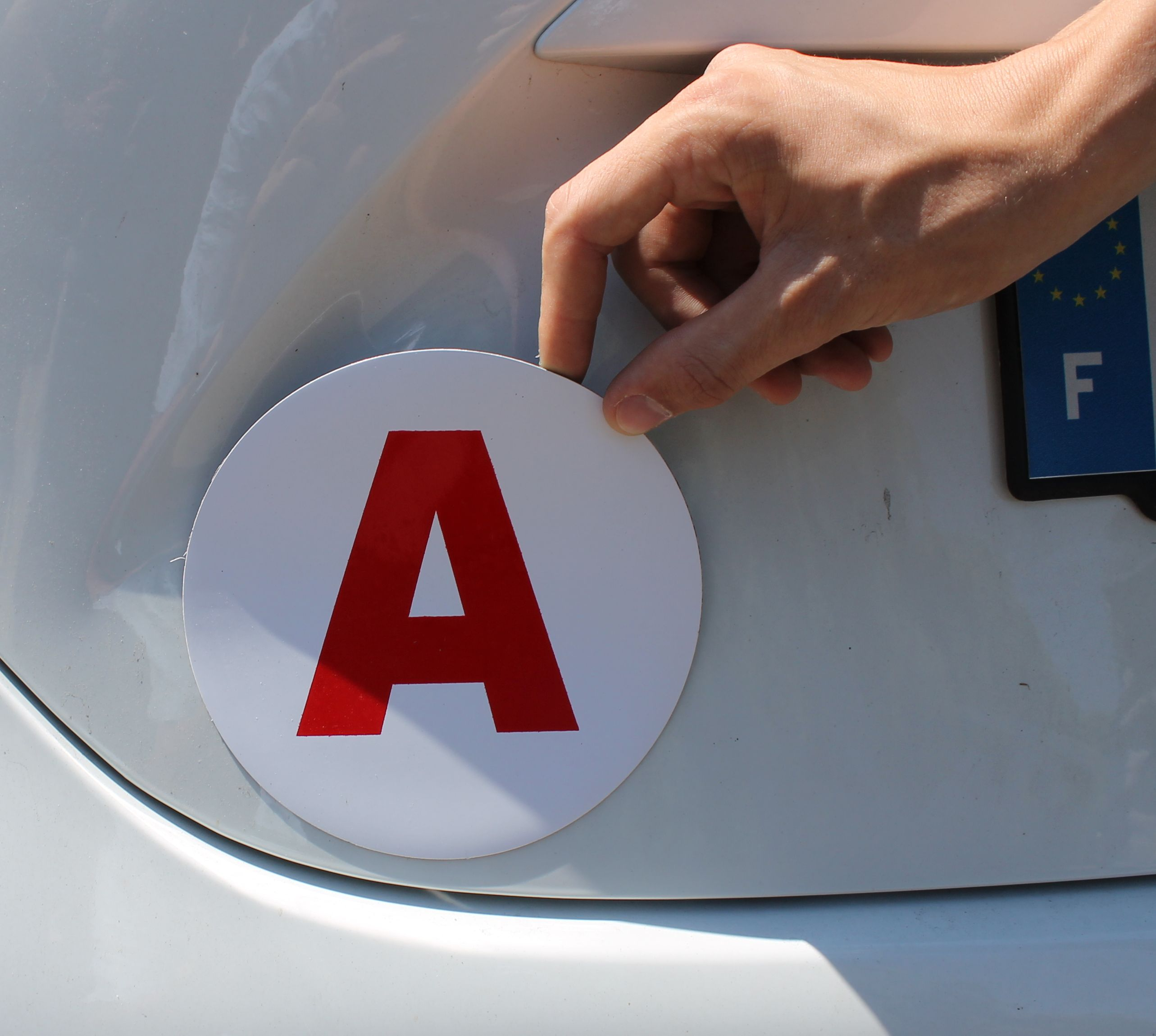
Disk A (magnetic).

The new driver's license holder must observe a probationary period of two years, compared with three years for a “classic” apprenticeship. Speed limits are the same as for a conventional probationary license, as described above.

After obtaining their driving license, learner drivers must affix an A disc to the lower rear of the vehicle's left-hand bodywork for a period of two years.

The starting capital is six points. The remaining points are progressively earned over two years, i.e. three points per year if no traffic offenses are committed, for a total of nine points after one year and twelve after two years (on the anniversary of the date on which the license was obtained).

If the young driver loses three points at once during the probationary period, he or she must attend a road safety awareness course after receiving a registered letter from the Ministry of the Interior, reference 48N. In addition, the learner driver must spend two years without an offense to be able to benefit from their capital of twelve points.

If a learner driver loses any points during the probationary period, he or she will automatically be awarded the full 12 points at the end of the probationary period, if he or she does not commit any offenses during the 3 years following the last point withdrawal.

However, in the event of a loss of points, the driver can also take courses to recover a maximum of 4 points.

== Advantages ==
The success rate for obtaining a driver's license is higher among young people who have undergone accompanied driving training compared to those who have not (74% versus 55%). Additionally, the cost of a driver's license with accompanied driving is significantly lower than that of traditional training (€1,110 on average for accompanied driving training compared to €1,665 for traditional training). These are not current prices.

In case of repeated failures, the driving theory test remains valid for five years or five practical exams. If an AAC (Accompanied Driving) file is converted to a standard category B license (after a failure, for example), the theory test remains valid, whereas it used to have to be retaken to switch tracks until December 2009.

Moreover, the probationary license period is reduced from three years to two.

It also appears that young drivers who have benefited from the accompanied driving system have fewer accidents than others (the risk is reduced by five times). As a result, insurance companies offer them lower rates. The additional premium imposed on young drivers is often halved in the first year and most of the time disappears entirely by the second year for those who completed accompanied driving. However, according to a statistical study conducted by an insurance company, the reduction in accident risk is around 10%.

Parents who insure their cars for their children (license holders) do not incur any additional fees. Insurance prices remain the same with accompanied driving.

An indirect benefit of accompanied driving is often highlighted: a refresher on traffic regulations and improved adherence to driving rules by the accompanying persons.

== Around the world ==
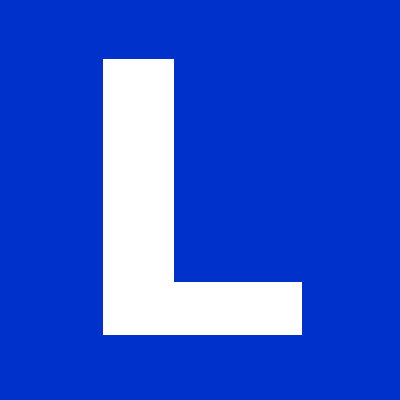
Symbol of accompanied driving in Switzerland.

In Canada, it is possible to obtain a learner's permit that allows driving a passenger vehicle under the supervision of someone who has held their license for at least two years.

In the United States, several states offer early driving training. For example, in Michigan, the Graduated Driver Licensing program allows driving accompanied by an adult starting at 14 years and 9 months.

In Germany (and also in Italy), there is an early driving training system called Begleitetes Fahren, which permits driving with an accompanying person starting at the age of 17.

In Switzerland, after passing the theoretical exam, a learner's permit (a white paper license) valid for two years and renewable is issued to the student. This permit allows driving with a driving school instructor or an accompanying person. The vehicle must be marked with a white "L" on a blue square, indicating Lernfahrer in German (or learner driver in English).

In Belgium, there are two pathways. The first is the free pathway, where after passing the theoretical exam, the student receives a provisional license valid for 36 months. This license allows driving with a driving school instructor or an accompanying person. The second pathway requires at least 20 hours of driving school after the theoretical exam, after which the student receives a provisional license valid for 18 months. This license allows driving with an instructor, an accompanying person, or even alone. In both cases, the vehicle must be marked with a white "L" on a blue rectangle.

== See also ==
- Driver's license
