= Road signs in France =

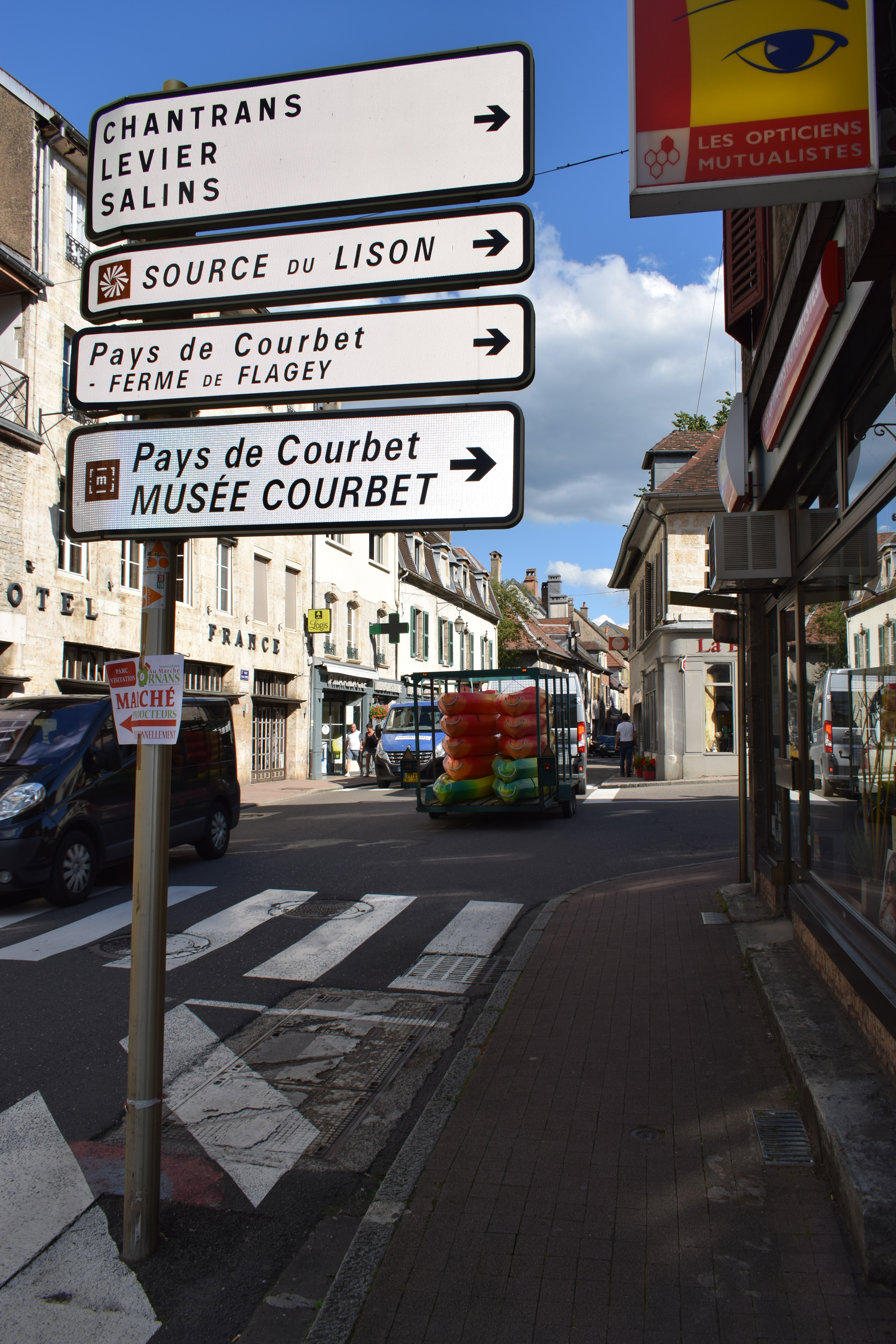
Road signs in Ornans.

Road signs in France refer to all conventional signals installed on French roads and intended to ensure the safety of road users, either by informing them of the dangers and regulations relating to traffic as well as elements useful for decision-making, or by indicating to them the landmarks and equipment useful for their travel on the national territory. They generally largely follow the general European conventions concerning the use of shape and colour to indicate their function. France is a signatory to the 1968 Vienna Convention on Road Signs and Signals. France signed the Vienna Convention on Road Signs and Signals on 8 November 1968 and ratified it on 9 December 1971.

These road signs can also be found in some overseas territories of France.

== History ==
The first road signs with modern symbols were created in France in 1902 by the Automobile Club of France, which had been founded in 1895. When cars started appearing in France in the 1900s, there were signs for motorists and cyclists with the words "Moderate Speed" or "Slow Down". On 11 October 1909, the first attempt at international unification of road signs was made in Geneva. Four round-shaped obstacle signs were adopted: "break", "Z-bends", "Level crossing with barrier" and "X-crossing".

In 1926, the four danger signs created and used since 1909 were definitively changed from the disc shape to the triangle shape still in use today. Unguarded level crossings were added, and in 1928, at Switzerland's request, one-way, direction, parking and no parking signs were adopted. In 1931, France signed the Geneva Convention concerning the unification of road signs and signals.

On 15 July 1942, during the occupation of French territories by Nazi Germany in World War II, a decree was signed amending the traffic rules: a sheet was to be placed around danger signs and the colour of the vignettes (previously dark blue) was to become black, as was the German custom. However, these changes were probably not implemented.

After the end of the war, a general instruction dated 1 August 1946 on road signs was published. This was the first document to regulate in detail all applications of road signs. Colours were standardised. The shape of some signs was changed, such as danger signs, the corners of which were now rounded. Some graphic elements were changed. New signs appeared: height limits, double speed limits for buses and cars, prohibition of lorries, thawing barriers, etc.

== Warning signs ==
Warning signs

Bend to right

Bend to left

Double bend first to right

Double bend first to left

Collapse or bump

Speed bump

Road narrows

Road narrows on right

Road narrows on left

Slippery road

Opening bridge ahead

Level crossing with gates

Level crossing without gates

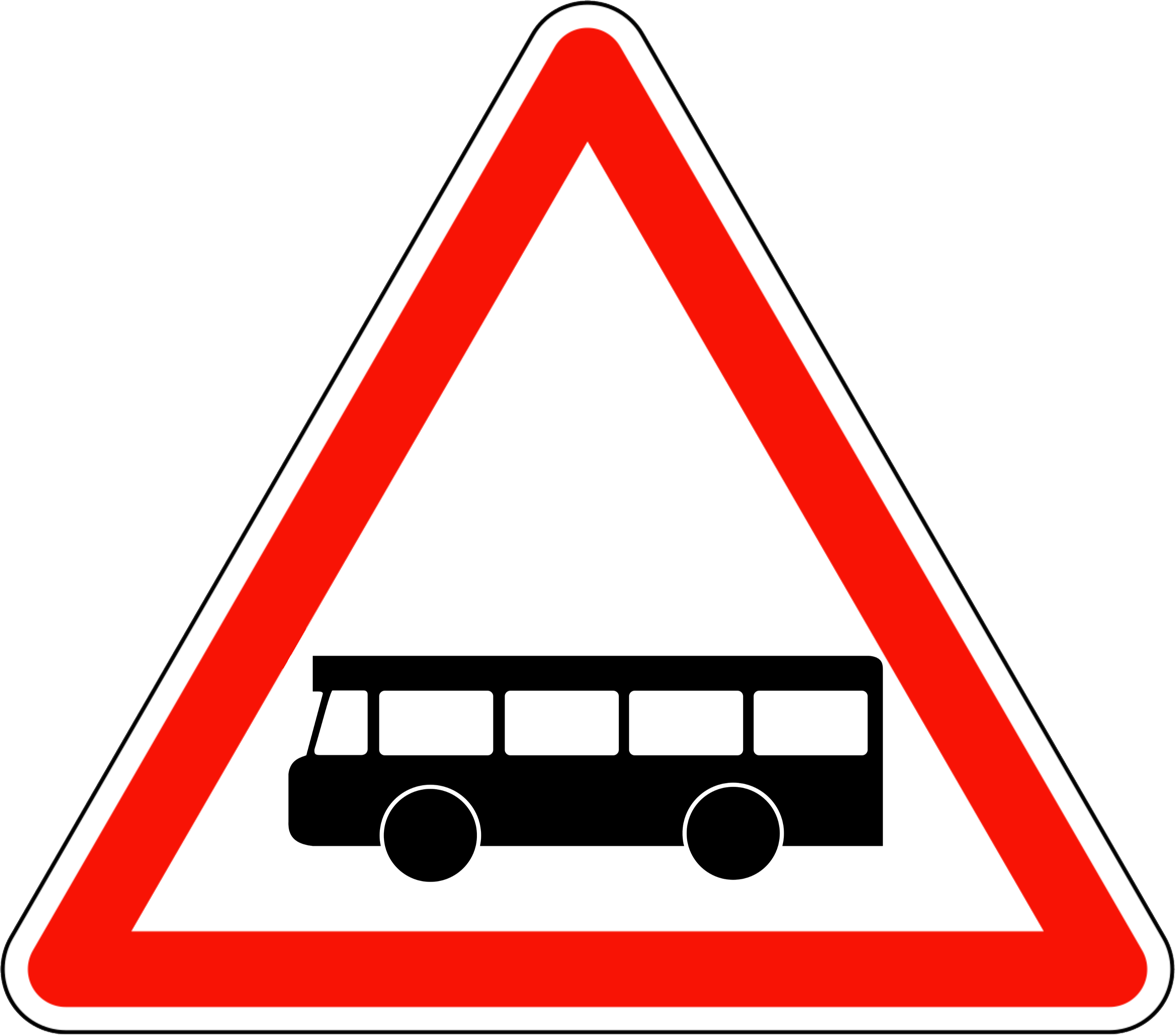
Buses crossing ahead

Trams crossing ahead

Children crossing

Pedestrian crossing ahead

Other danger

Cattle

Sheep

Wild animals

Equestrians

Steep hill downwards

Traffic light

Two-way traffic ahead

Risk of rockfall

Quayside or river bank

Cyclists

Low-flying aircraft

Side winds

== Priority signs ==
Priority signs

Crossroads with right of way from the right

Crossroads with priority

Give way

Give Way sign 150 metres ahead

Stop, give way

Stop sign 150 metres ahead

Priority road

End of priority road

Roundabout ahead

== Regulatory signs ==
Prohibitory signs

No entry

No vehicles

No overtaking

No overtaking by lorries

Length limit

No traffic allowed without indicated minimum distance between vehicles

Speed limit

No left turn

No right turn

No U-turns

Stop - customs

Stop - gendarmerie

Stop - police

Stop - toll

No parking

Parking restrictions

Parking restrictions

No stopping

No motor vehicles except mopeds

No motor vehicles including mopeds

No lorries

No pedestrians

No cycling

No horse-drawn vehicles

No tractors

No handcarts

No buses

No mopeds

No motorcycles

No vehicles towing caravans

Width limit

Height limit

Weight limit

Axle weight limit

Give priority to oncoming vehicles

No sounding of horns

No vehicles carrying explosives

No vehicles carrying water pollutants

No vehicles carrying dangerous goods

Other restrictions
Mandatory signs

Turn right

Turn left

Keep right

Keep left

Ahead only

Turn right ahead

Turn left ahead

Go ahead or turn right

Go ahead or turn left

Turn left or right

Bicycle lane

Pedestrian lane

Bridleway

Minimum speed

Snow chains compulsory

Bus lane

Tram lane

Other obligations

End of bicycle lane

End of pedestrian lane

End of bridleway

End of minimum speed

End of snow chains zone

End of bus lane

End of other obligations
End of restrictions

End of restriction

End of 50 km/h zone

End of no sounding of horns

End of other restrictions
Zonal prescription signs

No parking zone

Restricted parking zone

Disc parking zone

Meter parking zone

Restricted disc parking zone

End of a no parking zone

End of a restricted parking zone

End of a disc parking zone

End of a meter parking zone

End of a restricted disc parking zone

30 km/h zone

End of 30 km/h zone

Home Zone (20 km/h speed limit)

End of Home Zone

Pedestrian precinct

End of pedestrian precinct

Restricted access area

End of a restricted access area

Zone where winter equipment is compulsory

End of a zone where winter equipment is compulsory

== Information signs ==
Information signs

Parking zone

Disc parking zone

Meter parking zone

Risk of fire

Advisory speed

End of advisory speed

Taxi rank

Bus stop

Breakdown bay

Carsharing

One-way traffic

Dead end

Dead end (right)

Dead end permeable for pedestrians

Dead end permeable for pedestrians and cyclists

Road use restrictions

Road use restrictions

Priority over oncoming vehicles

Pedestrian crossing

Bus lane crossing

Tram crossing

Caravan parking restricted

Lane forbidden for use by lorries

Contra-flow cyclists

Contra-flow bus lane

Slip road to left

Slip road to right

Level crossing with gates on side road

Contra-flow cycle lane

Speed limits in France (at entrance to country)

Speed limits on motorways

Escape lane on right

Escape lane on left

Speed bump

Lanes merge

Lanes merge

Overtaking lanes

Overtaking lanes

End of overtaking lanes

Other information

Toll ticket marking point

Manned tollbooth

Toll payment by debit or credit card

Toll payment by cash

Toll payment by subscription

Expressway (controlled-access highway)

End of expressway

Tunnel

End of tunnel

Cycle route

End of cycle route

Pedestrian and cycle route

End of pedestrian and cycle route

Motorway

End of motorway

== Service signs ==
Service signs

First aid or hospital

Emergency telephone

Telephone

Information

Tourist information board

Campsite

Caravan site

Camping and caravan site

Youth hostel

Self-catering accommodation

Hiking itinerary

Winter sports itinerary

Picnic site

Motorail services

Video-monitored car park

Car ferry

Toilets

Services for the disabled

Petrol

Petrol and liquid petroleum gas

Petrol

Petrol and liquid petroleum gas

Petrol and charging station

Petrol, liquid petroleum gas and charging station

Charging station

Charging station and liquid petroleum gas

Restaurant

Hotel or motel

Buffet or confectionery

Mooring for boats

Cable car

Chairlift or gondola lift

Viewpoint

Local radio station

Playground

Drainage

ATM

Air pressure check

Recreation area

Repairs

Fire extinguisher

Emergency exit (right)

Emergency exit (left)

Other services

Eco-tax for lorries

Carpooling

== Location signs ==
Town signs

Entrance to town or village (speed limit 50 km/h)

End of town or village

== Railway signs ==
Railway signs

Level crossing without gates (single track) or aircraft crossing area

Level crossing without gates (several tracks)

Level crossing without gates (single track) or aircraft crossing area

Level crossing without gates (several tracks)

Level crossing without gates and with a flashing red warning light (single track)

Level crossing without gates and with a flashing red warning light (single track)

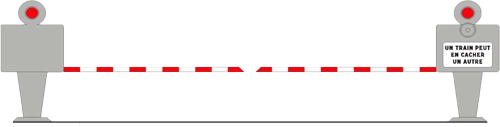
Gates

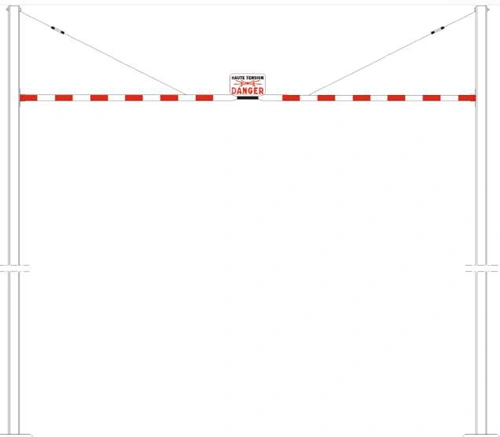
Gantry in the presence of high-voltage cables

== Temporary signs ==
Warning signs

Uneven road

Road narrows

Slippery road

Road works

Other danger

Temporary traffic signals

Loose chippings

Queues likely

Accident

Reduced visibility
Information signs

Other information

Lanes change

Lanes

Lanes merge

Lanes merge
Additional signs

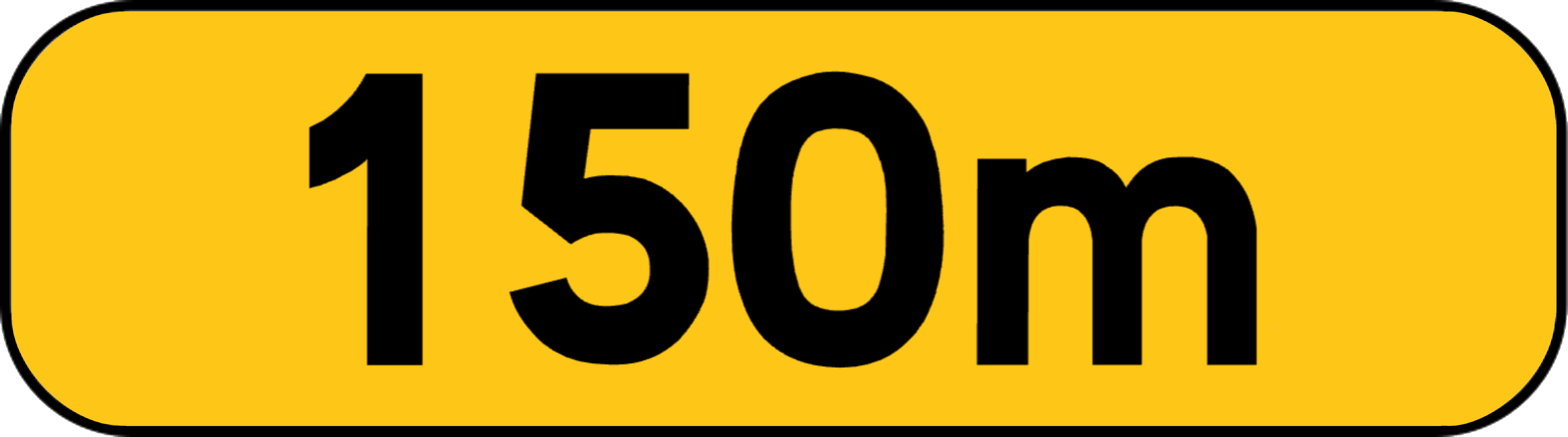
Distance

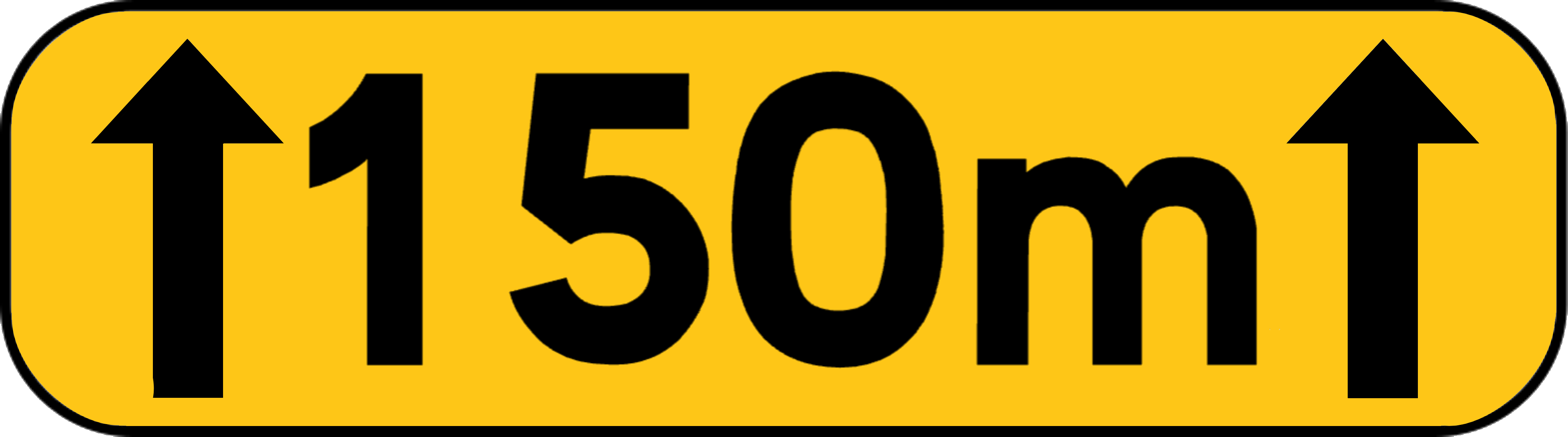
Extent

Other indication

== Additional signs ==
Distance signs

Distance

Distance to the next gas station
Extent sign

Extent
Direction signs

On the right lane

On the left lane

Right

Left

On the indicated lane
Vehicle categories

Cars

Buses

Motorbikes

Bicycles

Mopeds

Other category

Weight

Lorries

Weight of lorries

Tractors

Vehicles with snow chains

Vehicles carrying explosives

Vehicles carrying water polluants

Vehicles carrying dangerous goods

Disabled

Pedestrians

Length

Axle weight

Horse-drawn vehicles

Handcarts

Width

Height

Trailers

Vehicles towing caravans

Horses

Carsharing
Stop ahead sign

Stop ahead
Signs related to parking

Parked vehicles will be towed away

Parking restrictions

Disc parking restrictions

Parking for disabled only

Parking for electric vehicles only

Parking for carsharing only

Carpooling

Parking for carpooling only
Priority road sign

Course of the priority road at intersections
Lane section signs

Begin

End

Lane section

Right

Left

Right and left
Indication signs

Aircraft crossing

High voltage cables

Give way

Speed bump

Emergency phone

Emergency phone and fire extinguisher

Risk of accident

Risk of accident

Reserved lane

Reserved lanes

Noise protection

Except for bicycles

Except for bicycles

Other indication
Road number signs

Road number

Exit number

Ring

Ring number

Ring name
Other restrictions signs

Authorised vehicle category

Time slot

Other restrictions in a zone

Tunnel category for vehicles carrying dangerous goods

Tunnel category for vehicles carrying dangerous goods (with time restriction)

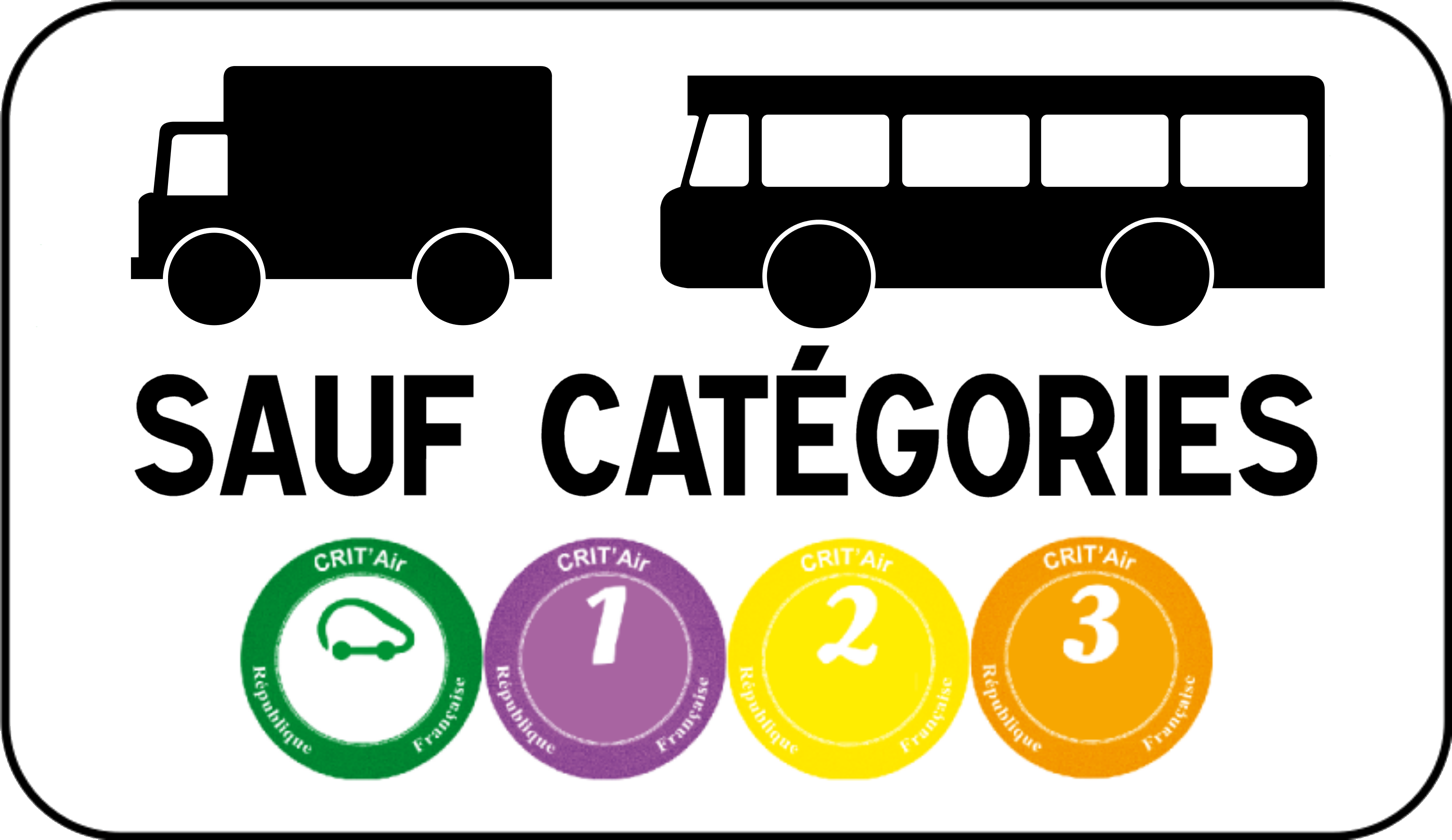
Low emission zone
Specific signs for bicycles

Bicycles are allowed to cross the red light for turning right

Bicycles are allowed to cross the red light for going straight

== Retired signs ==
=== 1926 road signs ===
1926 road signs

Uneven road

Series of bends

Crossroad

Level crossing with barriers

Level crossing without barriers

Danger

=== 1928 road signs ===
1928 road signs

Uneven road

Series of bends

Crossroad

Level crossing with barriers

Level crossing without barriers

Danger

Closed to all vehicles

Closed to all vehicles with exceptions

Closed to automobiles

Closed to lorries

Closed to motorcycles

Closed to bicycles

Closed to horses

No entry

No entry

Direction to be followed

Parking

No parking

No entry for specified vehicle category

=== 1931 road signs ===
1931 road signs

Uneven road

Series of bends

Crossroad

Level crossing with barriers

Level crossing without barriers

Danger

Yield

No vehicles

No entry

No motor vehicles except motorcycles

No motorcycles

No motor vehicles

No lorries

Weight limit

Motor vehicle weight limit

Speed limit

No overtaking

No stopping

No parking

Mandatory direction

Customs

Parking

Caution

First aid

=== 1946 road signs ===
1946 road signs

Crossroad

Yield

Series of bends

Level crossing with barriers

Level crossing without barriers

Opening bridge

Uneven road

Danger

Special warning sign

No motor vehicles

Height limit

No entry

No overtaking

Speed limit

Speed limit for different vehicles

Weight limit

No lorries

No parking

No heavy vehicles due to melting of ice

Stop at customs

Direction to be followed

Cycle path

Caution

Crossroad with minor road

School

Parking

=== 1952 road signs ===
==== Warning signs ====
1952 road signs

Give way

Crossroad with priority

Crossroad

Dangerous bends

Right curve

Left curve

Double right curve

Double left curve

Steep descent

Road narrows

Slippery road

Uneven road

Draw bridge

Pedestrian crossing

Children

Animals

Roadworks

Level crossing with gates

Level crossing without gates

Countdown marker

Countdown marker

Countdown marker

Countdown marker

Other danger

==== Regulatory signs ====
No vehicles

No entry

No motor vehicles except motorcycles

No motorcycles

No motor vehicles

No bicycles

No trucks

Weight limit

Axle weight limit

Width limit

Height limit

No left turn

No right turn

Stop

Customs

Restricted stopping or parking

No overtaking

Speed limit

End of speed limit

Turn right

Turn left

Proceed straight

Roundabout

Bicycle path

==== Information signs ====
Priority road

Priority road ends

Parking

Hospital

First aid

Repair service

Public telephone

Petrol station

==== 1963 addition ====
Low-flying aircraft

Wild animals

Two-way traffic

No overtaking by lorries

No beeping

Minimum speed limit

End of speed limit

End of no overtaking

End of no overtaking by lorries

End of no beeping

Camping

== Influences ==
Due to historical reasons that led to the colonization of several African countries by France and the subsequent spread of the influence of the French road sign system, road signs in Morocco, Algeria, Tunisia and the rest of the French-speaking African countries are similar in design to the modern road signs used in mainland France as well as in its overseas territories including Réunion, Mayotte, French Guiana. One of the differences is that road signs in Morocco, Algeria and Tunisia display text in both Arabic and French.
