= Driving Schools Association of the Americas =

Trade association

- Abbreviation: DSAA
- Formation: 1973; 53 years ago
- Type: Nonprofit
- Legal status: Trade association
- Purpose: Represent driving schools and promote road safety
- Location: Pasco, Washington, United States
- Region served: North America including United States and Canada
- Services: International conferences, road safety
- Members: 8,000 (2024)
- Official language: English
- Funding: Member fees
- Website: www.dsaa.org

The Driving School Association of the Americas (DSAA) is a trade association for driving school owners, founded in 1973.

== Overview ==
The DSAA represents 8,000 businesses in the USA, that are engaged in driver's education including 6,000 professional driving schools . Through its membership, the DSAA represents 50,000 driving educators. The DSAA is one of the largest organizations in the world that focuses on improving road traffic safety and reducing death and injury from road traffic accidents. The DSAA is headquartered in the USA in Kettering, Ohio.

== See also ==
- Transportation safety in the United States
