= Drivotrainer =

Automobile driving simulator

The Drivotrainer was an automobile driving simulator promoted by the Aetna Insurance Company and widely used in driver training classes.

As an automobile insurer since 1902, Aetna had a financial interest in promoting highway safety. The company committed to innovating new methods of driver instruction in 1935, when it introduced the "Reactometer", the first machine designed to record motorists' reaction time. The Reactometer was awarded the Grand Prix at the Paris Exposition of 1937, after which it toured the United States as part of a highway safety exhibit, and was displayed at the 1939 New York World's Fair.

Aetna next developed the "Driverometer", a trainer which used color motion pictures to simulate actual driving conditions and the "Roadometer", which provided a short motion picture test including most phases of automobile operation and provided a scorecard.

In 1951, Aetna developed the Aetna Drivotrainer, the first combination of automobile simulator and motion pictures designed for behind-the-wheel instruction in drivers' training classrooms. The Drivotrainer classroom contained 15 small single seat "Aetnacars" equipped with controls as similar as possible to those used in actual automobiles. The gas pedal changed the volume of the engine noise, the steering wheel and the clutch and brake pedals provided realistic resistance, even the seat mimicked an actual automobile seat, simulating a realistic on-road driving experience in the safety of the classroom. A motion picture projected on a large screen in front of the room provided the visual stimulus of a drive on streets and highways, while the students "drove" their simulators. Their responses were collected and recorded on a central unit for the instructor to monitor and correct.

The complete course included 22 films produced by Aetna in its motion picture bureau, in collaboration with the New York City Department of Education. The final exam film constituted a difficult 25-minute road test including many varied traffic situations and highway emergencies. These films were the first complete driver training course recorded on film to support classroom simulation.

The fronts and sides of the Aetnacars were designed to give a general automotive impression, with nonfunctional features such as headlights and bumpers, somewhat similar to the design of bumper cars and other arcade rides. Over time, their appearance was periodically updated, and later versions were equipped with simulated automatic transmission controls, rather than clutches and manual shift levers. The company also developed advanced driver improvement programs for the U.S. Postal Service and several states.

In the late 1970s Aetna sold the Drivotrainer business to Doron Precision Systems, the company that manufactured the simulators. Aetna eventually sold its property and casualty insurance business, including automobile insurance, to The Travelers Companies in 1996.
