= Patricia Waller =

- Born: 1962 (age 62–63); Santiago, Chile
- Occupation: Artist

Patricia Waller (1962) is a textile artist from Santiago, Chile, who lives and works in Berlin, Germany. She is known for her bright cartoon style crochet work that often has a macabre element to it.

== Biography ==
Waller was born in 1962 in Santiago, Chile. In 1968 Waller moved with her family to Germany. She studied at the Free Art School in Nürtingen from 1983 to 1985. She received her diploma and master's degree from the Academy of Fine Arts in Karlsruhe, studying sculpture there from 1985 to 1990.

She was a lecturer at the University of Applied Science in Pforzheim, Germany from 2002 to 2004; also at Textile Department in the Institute for Art and Art History at the University of Cologne from 2003 to 2004/ 2007; and at the Department Textile Studies and Research in the Institute for Cultural Studies and Social Science at the University of Osnabrück.

== Artworks ==
In her final year of art school, Waller created her first crochet piece for which her practise is known. The first artwork that Waller crocheted was a bomb. She then went on to re-create iconic pieces from art history like Joseph Beuys' dead hare or Jeff Koons' "Rabbit". She went on to create technology then medical inspired devises before settling into her iconic style of macabre cartoon images. Her work uses cute or kitsch crocheted forms that have a violent edge to them such known TV cartoon figures that are stabbed and bloody or stuffed animals that have been flattened by some mishap.

=== Selected solo exhibitions ===
- Innocent, 2019 Gallery Tobias Schrade, Ulm, Germany; 2018, Galerie Deschler, Berlin, Germany
- At the circus, 2016, Kunstverein Speyer, Germany; 2015, Gallery Deschler, Berlin, Germany; 2015, Kunstverein Nürtingen, Germany
- The violent needle, 2016, Shirley's Temple Art, Shanghai, China
- Broken Heroes, 2015, Gallery Tobias Schrade, Ulm, Germany; 2012, Gallery Deschler, Berlin, Germany
- Bad Luck, 2012, Gallery Tobias Schrade, Ulm, Germany; 2009, Kunsthalle Osnabrück, Germany; 2009, Gallery Deschler, Berlin, Germany
- Follow the thread, 2011, BWA Galeria, Zielona Góra, Poland; 2011, Museum junge Kunst, Frankfurt Oder, Germany
- Sailor's Yarn, 2004, Gallery Tobias Schrade, Ulm, Germany; 2003, Gallery Marcus Schmitz, Cologne, Germany
- Handmade, 2002, Gallery Metropolitana, Barcelona, Spain; 2002, EnBW Energie AG, Sonycenter, Berlin, Germany

=== Selected group exhibitions ===
- My Hero! Bedford Gallery, 2016, Lesher Center for the Arts, CA, USA, and California Center of the Arts, Escondido, CA, USA
- Neue Masche, 2011, Museum Bellerive, Museum für Gestaltung, Zurich, Switzerland
- Woven World, Internationale Triennial Textile Arts, 2011, Musée des Beaux-Arts de Tournai, Belgium
- Trouble set me free, 2010, Margaret Lawrence Gallery, Melbourne, Australia
- Loops, 2010, Nordic house, Reykjavik, Iceland
- Ten Years Hunting, 2010, Parker's Box, New York City
- Dritto Rovescio, 2009, Triannale Design Museum, Milan, Italy
- International fiber biennial, 2008, Snyderman-Works Gallery, Philadelphia, USA
- D-Haus..D-Street, 2005–2006 Executive Committee German Year in Japan, Tokyo, Japan
- Left Hand, Right Hand, 2003, 798 Space, Beijing, China

== Honours, decorations, awards and distinctions ==
- Art award of the Werner Stober Foundation, 2002
- Scholarship Cité Internationale des Arts, 1999 Paris, France
- One-year scholarship, 1995, Columbia College, Chicago, USA
- DAAD-scholarship, 1993 Ghent, Belgium
