= Speed limits in France =

Main speed limits on French roads, as displayed at the border, unless adverse weather (rain, etc.) or specific speed limit implies a different limit

French roads have a variable maximum speed limit that depends on weather conditions. In dry weather, roads in urban areas have a default speed limit of 50 km/h, and outside urban areas have the following limits:

- single carriageway roads have a default speed limit of 80 km/h,
- dual carriageway roads, with a central reservation between the two carriageways, have a default limit of 110 km/h,
- Autoroutes (motorways) built to the normal design standard have a default limit of 130 km/h. (Note: Motorways may exceptionally be decreed that do not conform to normal standards due to topographical constraints, if they extend from a motorway that does comply with design standards. In this case, the speed limit normally applying to the road of that type applies.)

On single-carriageway rural roads, a maximum speed limit of 90 km/h applies for a direction of traffic if at least two lanes are provided, but must be explicitly signed as such. (For a 3-lane road, with a passing lane in one direction, this means the speed limit may be different for each direction of traffic.) Since December 2019, departments may signpost other single-carriageway roads under their control as 90 km/h, but only after an accident study has been performed by the department's road safety commission.

Urban authorities, after consultation, may also increase speed limits on certain urban roads from 50 to 70 km/h, in cases where local or pedestrian access to the road is limited and suitably protected. The Code de la route also explicitly sets the 70 km/h speed limit for Paris' Boulevard Périphérique under this regulation.

When raining, the default speed limit on dual carriageway roads is reduced to 100 km/h, and on motorways 110 km/h (or 100 km/h if signposted for a lower dry-weather speed than the 130 km/h default). Single carriageway roads are reduced to 80 km/h — in practice, this now only applies for such roads that have since returned to 90 km/h. Urban speed limits are unaffected by weather. The general speed limit is lowered to 50 km/h on all roads in the fog or other low-visibility conditions if visibility is under 50 metres.

Those limits are not systematically signaled as they are the default limit. For instance the name of a town or village at its entry is an implicit limitation to 50 km/h; the crossed name at the exit is the corresponding end of limit. This matches the way 1968 Vienna Convention on Road Traffic defined a built-up area (in English, or agglomération in French). However, additional 50 km/h speed limit signs, or other speed limit sign, might be added to make it more explicit.

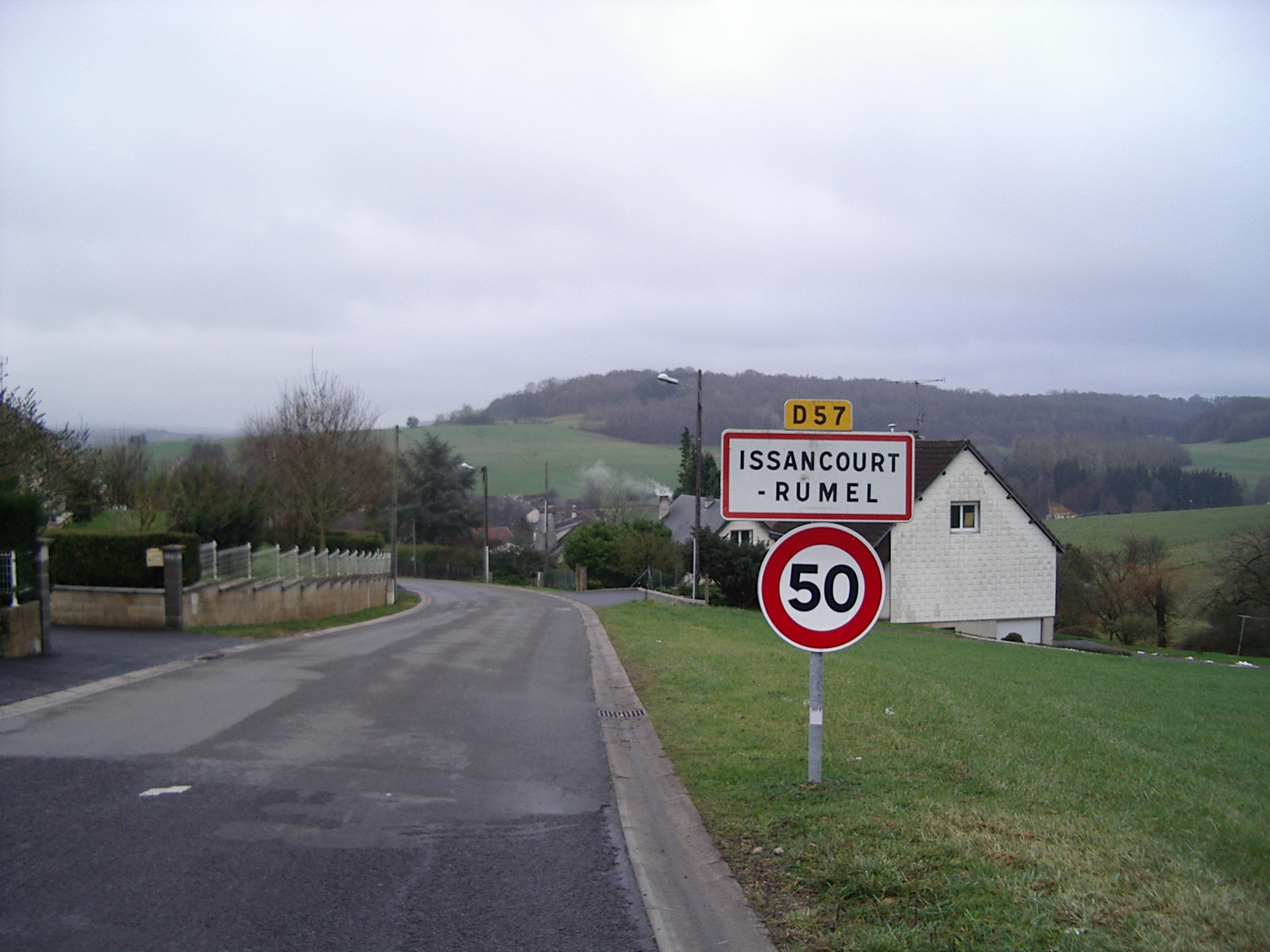
Explicit 50 km/h sign in village entry at Issancourt-et-Rumel, Ardennes.

Vehicles over 3.5 metric tons of maximum total weight have lower speed limits. Lorries of more than 12 metric tons (except dangerous goods and trailers that may have lower limits) may not exceed 50 km/h in urban areas (even if the speed limit was raised to 70 km/h), 90 km/h on highways, and 80 km/h elsewhere. Lorries under 12 metric tons but over 3.5 have the same limits except 90 km/h on 4-lane expressways. Buses may not exceed 100 km/h on highways and 4-lane expressways.

Minimum or recommended speeds are very rarely marked in France, though vehicles incapable of sustaining 60 km/h are not allowed on highways/motorways and you must be driving at 80 km/h or higher to use the left-most lane of a highway/motorway.

From 1 July 2018, 80 km/h has become the default maximum speed limit on a network of around 400,000 kilometers of road. Protests against the lowering of the speed limit on rural roads to 80 km/h were held due to the unpopularity of the decision, on the assumption that an 80 km/h speed is too slow and that there has been insufficient assessment done. This contributed in French rural areas to the beginning of the "Gilets Jaunes" (Yellow vests movement).

Article R413-17 of the Code de la route confirms that speed limits are designed for optimal traffic conditions, clear weather and a vehicle in good condition. Drivers not adapting their speed to the conditions of the road and obstacles ahead (including a number of stated cases in the code) is an infringement in spite of the applicable speed limit.

== A table summarizing default speed limits ==
	Built-Up Areas	Rural roads	Dual Carriageways with at least two lanes with a dividing lane	Autoroutes (motorways)
Cars and motorcycles	50 km/h	80 km/h	110 (100 when raining)	130 (110 when raining)
Cars with a trailer with a GVW not exceeding 3.5 tons and young drivers with the letter "A"	50 km/h	80 (even when signs allow higher speeds)	100 km/h	110 km/h
Buses	50 (even when signs allow higher speeds)	80 (even when signs allow higher speeds)	100 km/h	
Trucks, and rcars with a trailer when the sum of the vehicles exceeds 3.5 tons	50 (even when signs allow higher speeds)	80 (even when signs allow higher speeds)	90 km/h	
Buses carrying standing passengers	50 (even when signs allow higher speeds)	70 km/h		
All vehicles listed above during fog limiting visibility to less than 50 meters	50 km/h			
Towing Vehicle	40 km/h		40 km/h (you can only tow to the nearest exit)	Private towing prohibited

== History and trends ==
The urban speed limit was lowered from 60 to 50 km/h (37 to 31 mph) on 1 December 1990.

In some cities, 30 km/h is being developed as a common speed limit in zone 30 to provide greater security with pedestrian and cyclists.

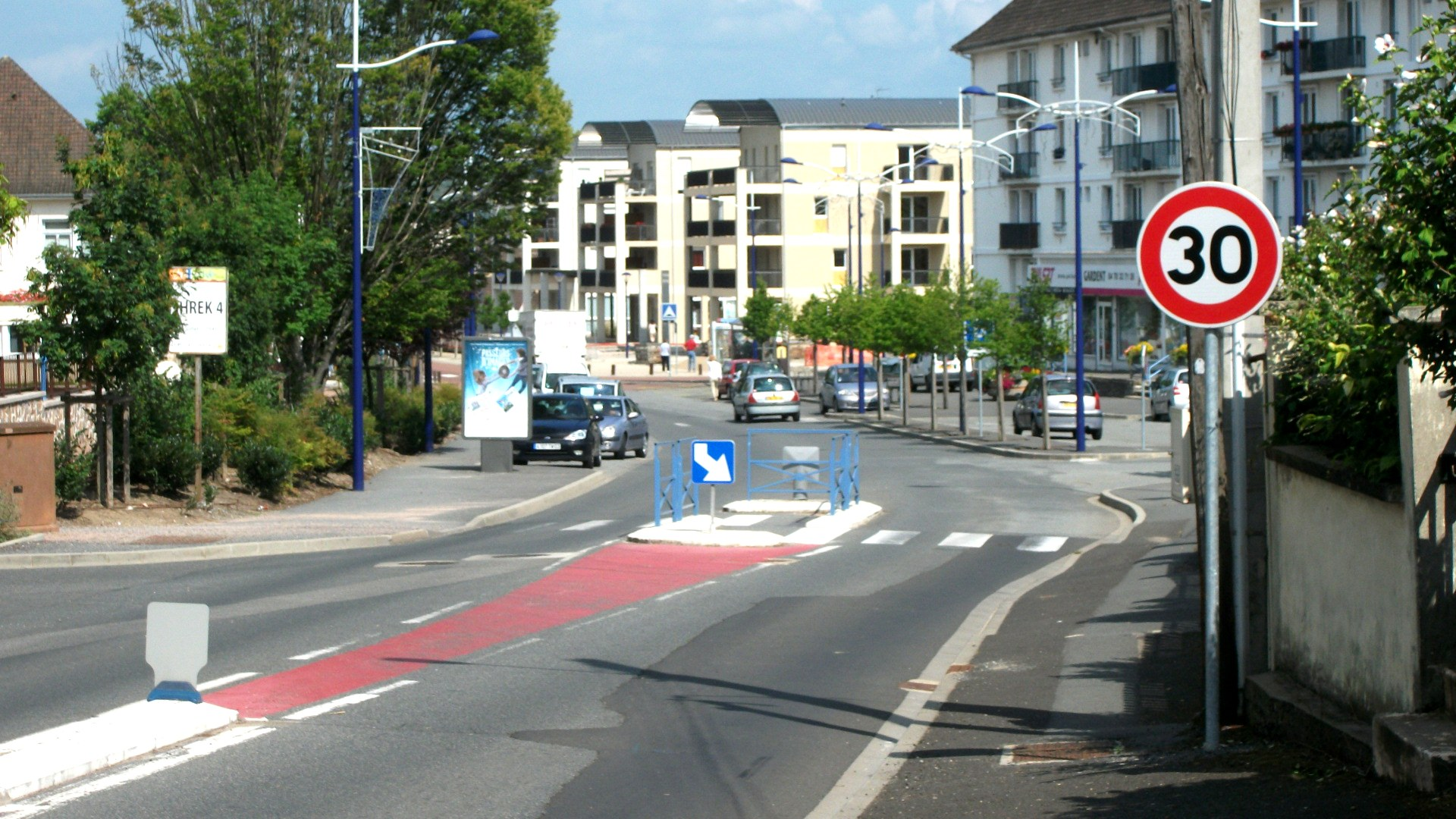
A street with a 30 km/h speed limit in Bellerive-sur-Allier.

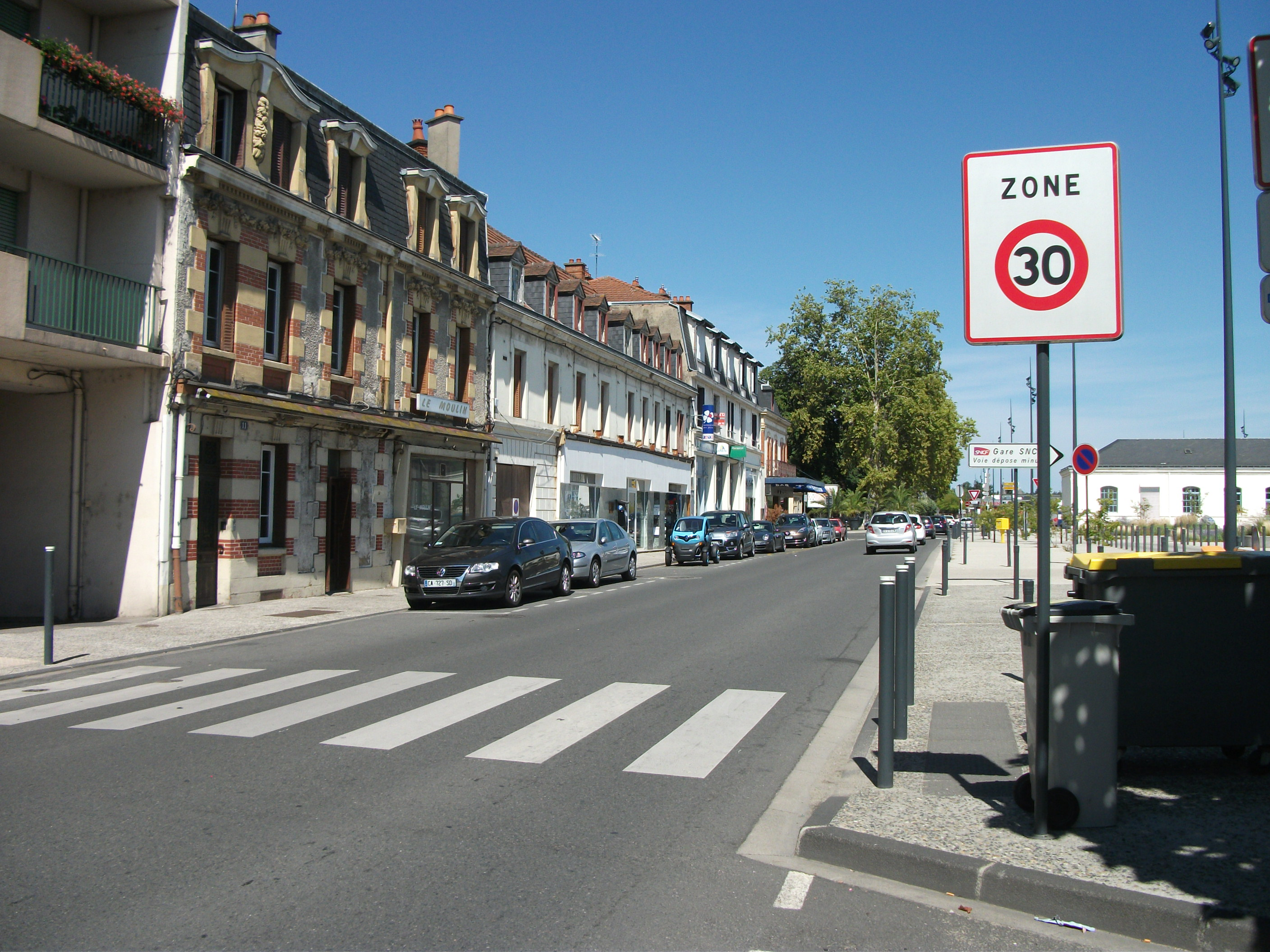
A "Zone 30" zone near of Moulins-sur-Allier railway station.

In 2005, a governmental report advised lowering the higher highway speed to 115 km/h in order to save fuel and reduce accident risks, but this proposal was badly received. Since 2002, the French government has installed a number of automatic radar guns on autoroutes, routes nationales, and other major thoroughfares. These are in addition to radar units operated by the French National Police and the Gendarmerie. The French authorities have credited this increase in traffic enforcement with a 50% drop in road fatalities from 2002 to 2006 (except on Motorways, where the fatalities rose by 15% between 2002 and 2006).

=== Introduction of 80 km/h default speed limit ===
On 9 January 2018 the national government announced 80 km/h (instead of 90) as a standard speed limit on secondary network, due to the many fatalities still happening on these roads. This was after experimentation which included a speed limit change from 90 to 80 between 2010-2015 and 2015-2017 which resulted in a reduction in road fatalities. The 80 km/h national limit entered into force on 1 July 2018.

The default speed limit changes still provided for single carriageway roads to remain 90 km/h for a certain direction of traffic, if it was catered for by more than one lane (ie. a passing lane). Stretches of road signposted as 90 km/h under this exemption must be notified by local authorities to the national road safety minister.

The ONISR (the French state's national road safety centre) released progressive reports into the effects of the reduction in the speed limit over time, resulting in a final report released in July 2020, covering the first 20 months of operation. (Note: Although intended as a two-year study, the analysis chose to release data up to February 2020 only, due to the effects of the COVID-19 pandemic on movement and thus traffic volumes in the remainder of the study period.) The study noted a 10% decrease in the number of fatalities on rural non-motorway roads compared to the five-year average prior to the law change, and fewer accidents resulting in fatalities. It also suggested a socio-economic benefit of €800 million per annum, as cost of longer travel times was outweighed by lower cost of accidents and lower fuel usage.

The ONISR study also attempted to gauge driver sentiment over the period; those somewhat or entirely opposed to the change still represented a small majority (52%) of those surveyed in June 2020, but had decreased from 70% in a survey taken before the change, with women more likely to be supportive of the change over time than men.

The change saw protests involving increased vandalisation of speed cameras using paint or tape; this accelerated after the yellow vests protests were formed by late 2018, with other road-related cost-of-living issues - such as fuel taxes and speeding fines - adding motivation for vandalisation. By January 2019, then-interior minister Christophe Castaner suggested that as much as 60% of speed cameras were disabled; the government later stated that the figure had increased to as much as 80% at one point.

=== Re-introduction of department discretion on 90 km/h limits ===
In an interview with France Info in May 2019, Prime Minister Edouard Philippe stated a willingness to devolve decisions about rural road speed limits to the departments, if the "highest levels of road safety" were guaranteed in the process.

After legislation passed in December 2019, departments were authorised to re-introduce the 90 km/h speed limit to single carriageway roads not covered by the multiple-lane exemption. The law requires that the department's road safety commission must be consulted, including the undertaking of an accident study for the stretch of road involved, before signposting such a road with the higher limit.

By the end of 2021, thirty-nine departments (of the 96 in metropolitan France; approximately 40%) had chosen to re-introduce 90 km/h speed limits on at least some roads that were affected by the previous reduction in the default speed limit.

Devolving power on the 90 km/h question only to the departments was criticised at the time by opposition parties such as The Republicans, who had requested this power also be extended to department-level prefects, so that speed limits could also be increased for single-carriageway national roads.

== Cities with wide 30 km/h speed limit ==
Many cities in France adopted a 30km/h speed limit, including but not limited to Montpellier, Grenoble, Lille and Nantes have 30 km/h default limits.. Cities enforcing such a limitation have road signs at their outskirts to inform drivers.

Paris will extend 30 km/h limits to cover the entire city from 2021, except the ring road and pedestrianised areas.

In 2024, nearly 440 towns have their main speed limit set to 30 km/h.

== References and Sources ==
- Sécurité Routière, Ministère de l'Écologie, de l'Énergie, du Développement durable et de la Mer, Délégation à la sécurité et à la circulation routières, RCS paris b 562 111 732, July 2009.
- Decree n°73-1073 or the "Code de la route", 3 December 1973, Journal Officiel, page 12844.
- Code de la route (available at www.legifrance.gouv.fr):
  - Article R413-2
  - Article R413-4
  - Article R413-3
