= Driver's education =

Formal class or program that prepares a new driver for obtaining a license

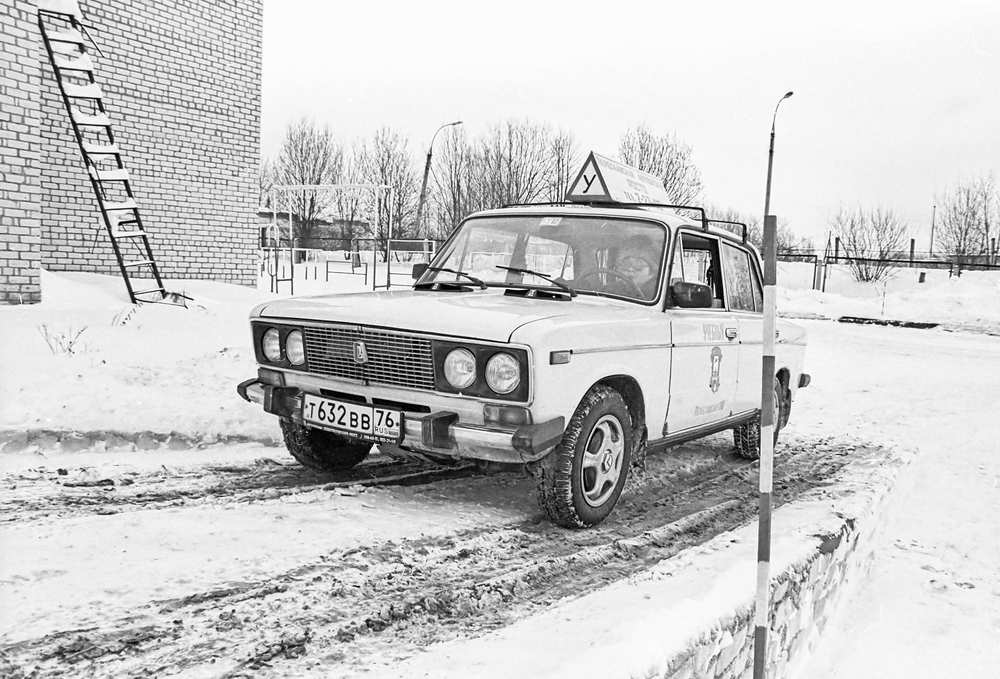
Driver student takes exercises in winter weather (Russia, 2002).

Driver's education, driver education, driving education, driver's training, driver's ed, driving tuition or driving lessons is a formal class or program that prepares a new driver to obtain a learner's permit or driver's license. The formal class program may also prepare existing license holders for an overseas license conversion or medical assessment driving test or refresher course. It may take place in a classroom, in a vehicle, online, or a combination of the above. Topics of instruction include traffic code or laws and vehicle operation. Typically, instruction will warn of dangerous conditions in driving such as road conditions, driver impairments, and hazardous weather. Instructional videos may also be shown, demonstrating proper driving strategies and the consequences for not observing the rules.

Education is intended to supplement the knowledge obtained from government-printed driving handbooks or manuals and prepares students for tests to obtain a driver's license or learner's permit. In-car instruction places a student in a vehicle with an instructor. A car fitted with dual controls, which has at least an auxiliary brake pedal and possibly other controls on the passenger side, may be used.

== History ==
Driver training began as a business in the United Kingdom in 1909-1910. The British School of Motoring (BSM) was founded in 1910 in South London by Hugh Stanley Roberts. It offered hands-on training and courses in driving skills (managing the controls and road aptitude) and repair. It also offered vehicles to drivers who wished to practice.

In the United States, Amos Neyhart, a professor at Penn State University, started the first high school driver education course in 1934 at a high school in State College, Pennsylvania.

== Instruction ==
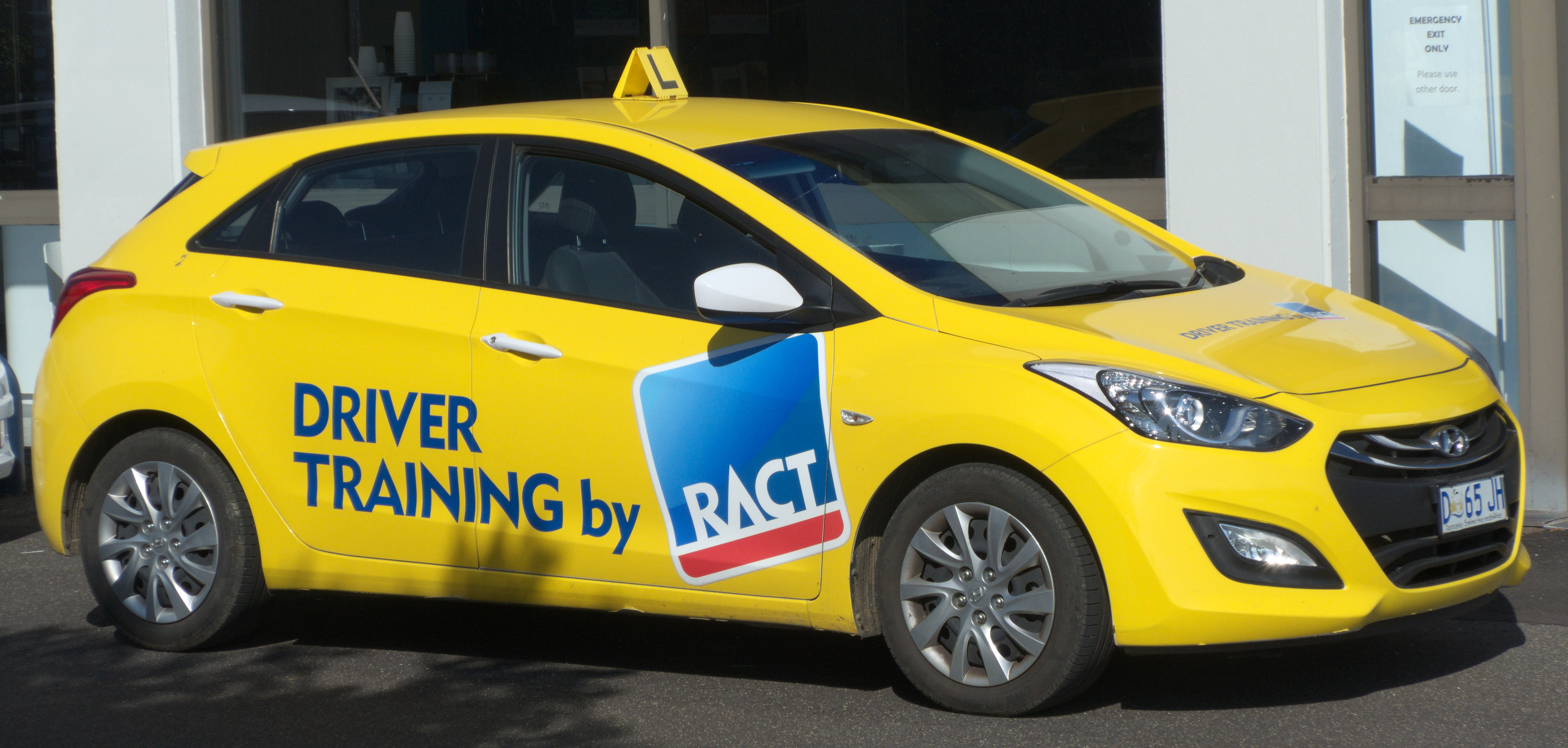
Royal Automobile Club of Tasmania training vehicle

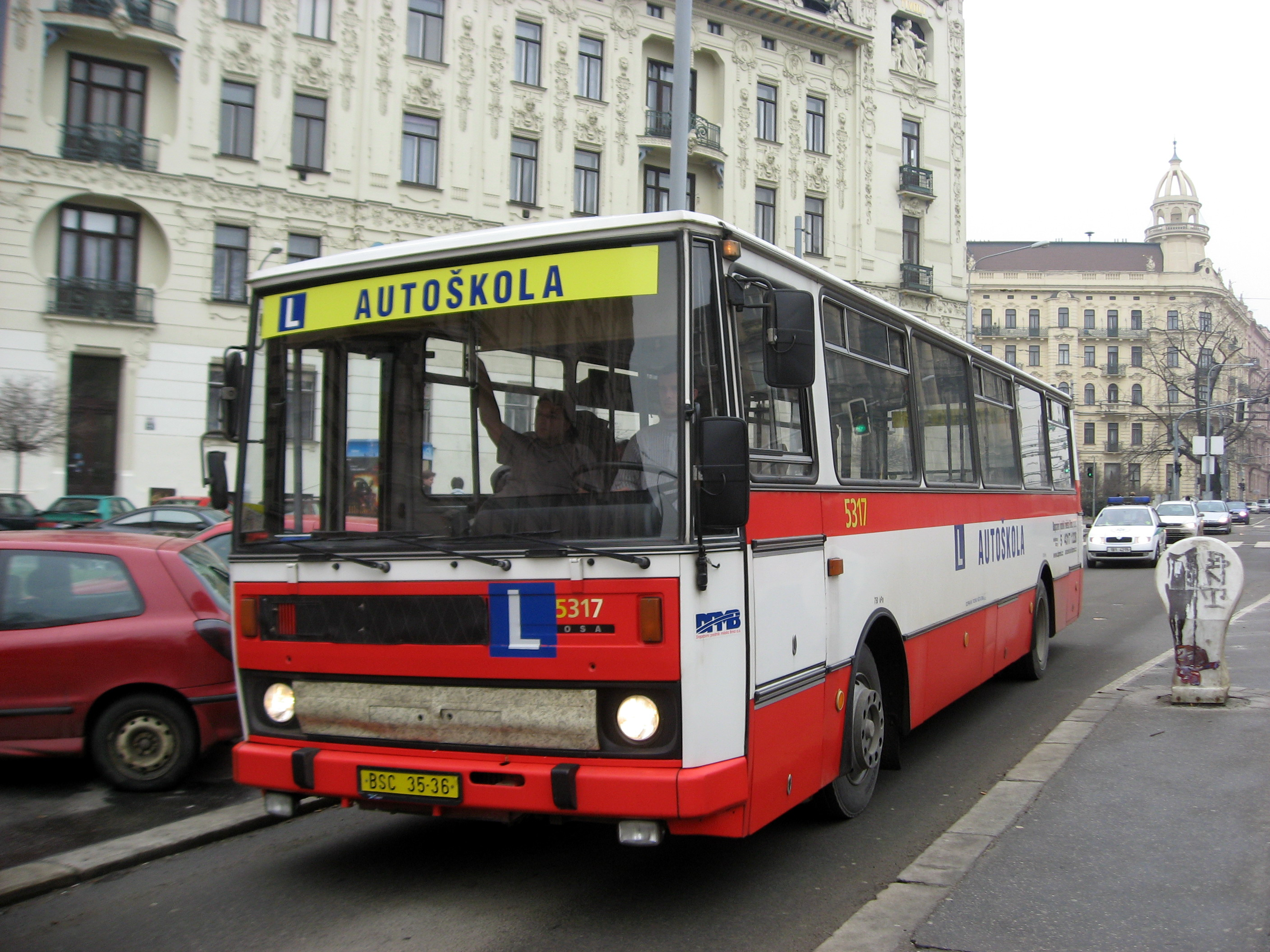
Driving school bus in Brno, Czech Republic

Driver's education (or driver education) is intended to supplement the knowledge obtained from government-printed driving handbooks or manuals and prepares students for tests to obtain a driver's license or learner's permit. In-car instruction places a student in a vehicle with an instructor. A car fitted with dual controls, which have pedals or other controls on the passenger side, may be used. In the United States, driver's education is typically offered to students who are sixteen years old or will be by the end of the course. Each state has its own laws regarding the licensing of teenagers.

In Germany, space is at a premium while traffic is able to flow very efficiently and with fewer collisions. The way in which people are taught driving fundamentals plays a huge role in the safety and efficiency of traffic. Within the United States, students may have access to online training, classroom training, or parent-taught courses. While these classes may provide a lot of information to the student, their effectiveness may only be limited to one area of knowledge. In Germany, students are given a hybrid of these classes. They have much more exposure throughout their school to real-world scenarios and classroom curriculum. Fundamentals of driving are reinforced in these classes, including the importance of turn-signal usage, keeping a safe distance behind others, and maintaining situational awareness. It is argued that more efficient and safer traffic flow can be achieved by increasing the length of the driver's education classes in the United States, to involve more hands-on training and strengthening of driving principles.

== Online courses ==
An online driving education is one of the most affordable and convenient ways to acquire driving education. Online driving courses are convenient because they allow students to learn and progress at their own pace. Many driver's education courses are available online. It is up to the relevant government authority to accept any such programs as meeting their requirements. Online drivers ed may be taken as a substitute for classroom courses in 13 states. Some car insurance agencies offer discounts to those students who have completed a driver's education program. Online programs allow parents to administer the behind the wheel driving instruction. Many studies have also started looking at the relationship between online activity, especially among the young adults, and driving licence holding.

In the United States driver education is regulated by each individual State. Typically the Department of Highway Safety and Motor Vehicles of the State such as Florida HSMV creates the rules for driver education, and courses are approved by the department before they can be offered to the public. Drivers completing driving education typically can avoid points to be assessed in their driver license, and also can usually obtain vehicle insurance discounts. A complete list of Florida Driver License Points is available directly from the official department.

== Obtaining a license ==
Successful completion of a driver education course is required by many agencies before young drivers receive their driver license or learner's permit. In some countries, students taking driver's education have the opportunity to receive a waiver for successful course completion, which allows them to receive a learner's permit or driver's license without taking some of the tests.

== On track ==
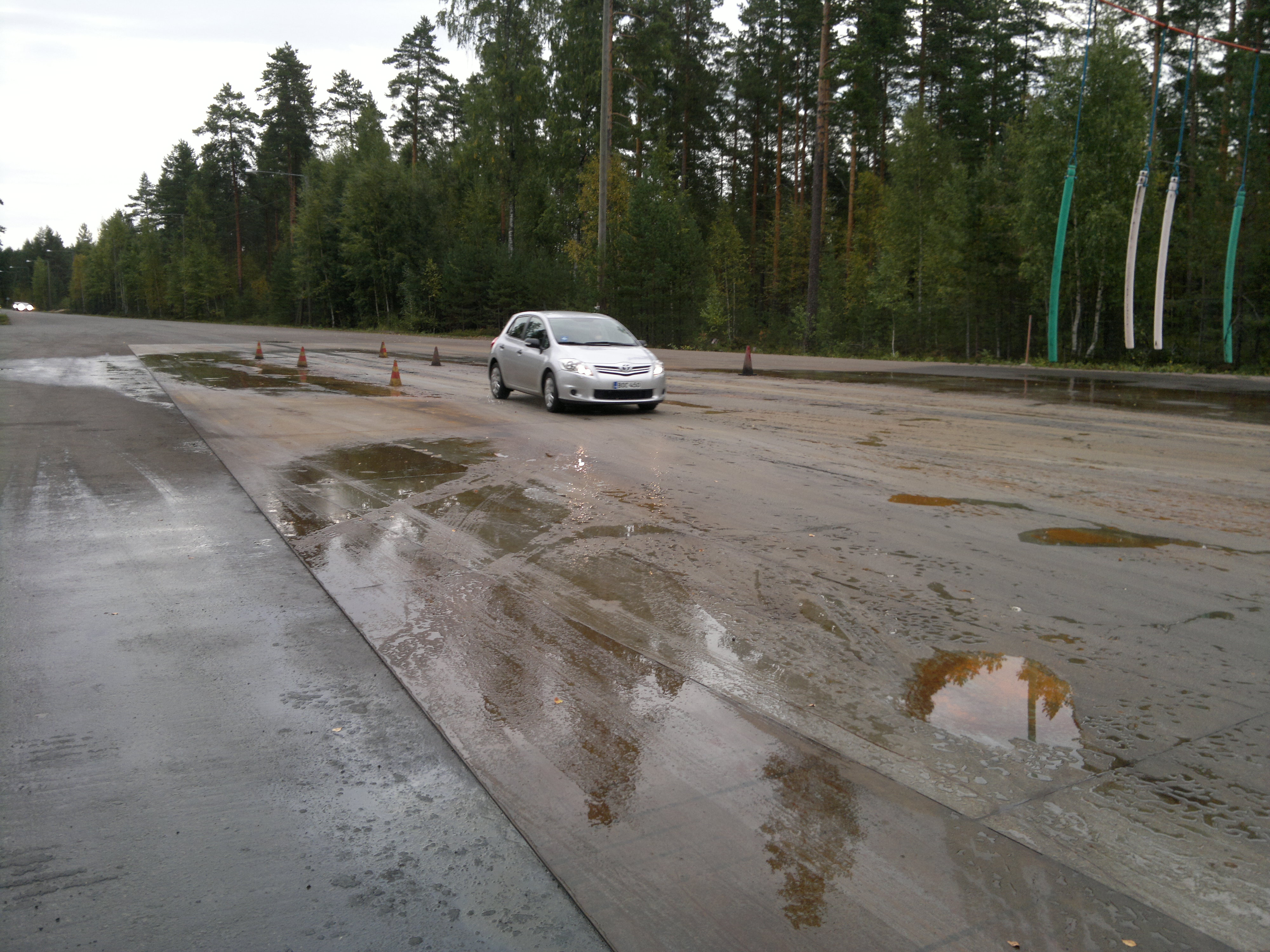
Toyota Auris on wet track during the second phase of driver's education in Niinisalo, Kankaanpää, Finland

Some car clubs conduct driver education programs focused on how to handle a car under high-speed driving conditions, rather than on learning the rules of the road. These programs take place at road racing courses and include both classroom instruction and vehicle-based instruction.

Students drive with an experienced instructor until they are "signed off", whereupon they can continue practicing and improving their skills without an instructor. Driver education programs involve multiple cars together on a racetrack, but they are not considered racing, because they are not timed, winners are not declared, and drivers must wait to pass until the driver being passed gives permission with a hand signal. These programs require approved racing helmets and rollover protection for convertibles. Some require long-sleeved shirts and long pants for fire safety. However, they do not require full roll cages, five or six-point seat belts, fire extinguishers, fire-resistant racing suits, or other safety features seen in racing.

== See also ==
- Blind spot (vehicle)
- Driving Schools Association of the Americas
- Impact Teen Drivers (in the United States)
- Nettleship v Weston, a 1971 court case which considered the standard of care that should be applied to a learner driver
- Drivotrainer
