= Vehicle registration plates of New Mexico =

New Mexico vehicle license plates

New Mexico
Current series
- Slogan: Yucca, turquoise and chile plates: Land of Enchantment; Chile plate only: Chile Capital of the World
- Size: 12 in × 6 in 30 cm × 15 cm
- Material: Aluminum
- Serial format: Yucca: 123-ABC; Turquoise: ABC-123; Chile: ABCD12
- Introduced: Yucca: 1991; Turquoise: 2010; Chile: July 2017

Availability
- Issued by: New Mexico Taxation and Revenue Department, Motor Vehicle Division
- Manufactured by: Waldale Manufacturing Limited, Amherst, Nova Scotia

History
- First issued: June 8, 1912

The U.S. state of New Mexico first required its residents to register their motor vehicles and display license plates in 1912. As of 2026, plates are issued by the New Mexico Taxation and Revenue Department through its Motor Vehicle Division. Only rear plates have been required since 1961.

New Mexico is the only state that specifies "USA" on its license plates, so as to avoid confusion with the country Mexico, which it borders to the southwest.

== Passenger baseplates ==
=== 1912 to 1960 ===
In 1956, the United States, Canada and Mexico came to an agreement with the American Association of Motor Vehicle Administrators, the Automobile Manufacturers Association and the National Safety Council that standardized the size for license plates for vehicles (except those for motorcycles) at 6 inches (15 cm) in height by 12 inches (30 cm) in width, with standardized mounting holes. The 1955 (dated 1956) issue was the first New Mexico license plate that complied with these standards.

Image	Dates issued	Design	Slogan	Serial format	Serials issued	Notes
	1912–13	Embossed green serial on white plate; diagonal "NM" at right	none	1234	1 to approximately 2100	
	1914	Embossed white serial on green plate; vertical "N M 14" at right	none	1234	1 to approximately 3100	First dated plate.
	1915	Embossed white serial on red plate; vertical "N M 15" at right	none	1234	1 to approximately 4700	
	1916	Embossed silver serial on dark blue plate; vertical "N M 16" at right	none	1234	1 to approximately 8300	
	1917	Embossed black serial on orange plate with border line; vertical "N M 17" at right	none	12345	1 to approximately 14500	
	1918	Embossed light blue serial on gray plate with border line; vertical "N M 18" at right	none	12345	1 to approximately 19000	
	1919	Embossed black serial on white plate with border line; vertical "N M 19" at right	none	12345	1 to approximately 17500	
	1920–23	Dark blue serial on white porcelain plate; vertical "NM" at right	none	12345	1 to approximately 49000	Revalidated for 1921 with red diamond-shaped tabs, for 1922 with silver octagonal tabs, and for 1923 with yellow star-shaped tabs.
	1924	Embossed black serial on orange plate with border line; "N.M. 1924" centered at bottom	none	12-345	1 to approximately 39-000	
	1925	Embossed white serial on black plate with border line; "N.M. 1925" centered at bottom; vertical "FRONT" or "REAR" at left	none	12345	1 to approximately 47000	Issued in pairs, for the front and the rear of the vehicle respectively.
	1926	Embossed red serial on gray plate with border line; vertical "NM" and "26" at left and right respectively	none	12345	1 to approximately 51000	
	1927	Embossed black serial on yellow plate with border line; embossed Zia sun symbol at left with "27" in the center; "NEW MEXICO" centered at bottom	none	12-345	1 to approximately 55-000	First use of the full state name and Zia sun symbol.
	1928	Embossed beige serial on dark blue plate with border line; embossed Zia sun symbol at left with "28" in the center; "NEW MEXICO" centered at bottom	none	12-345	1 to approximately 65-000	
	1929	Embossed red serial on light yellow plate with border line; embossed Zia sun symbol at left with "29" in the center; "NEW MEXICO" centered at bottom	none	12-345	1 to approximately 75-000	
	1930	Embossed golden yellow serial on black plate with border line; embossed Zia sun symbol at left with "30" in the center; "NEW MEXICO" centered at bottom	none	12-345	1 to approximately 71-000	
	1931	Embossed black serial on golden yellow plate with border line; embossed Zia sun symbol at left with "31" in the center; "NEW MEXICO" centered at bottom	none	12-345	1 to approximately 70-000	
	1932	Embossed white serial with Zia sun symbol separator on green plate; "NEW MEX 32" at left	"SUNSHINE STATE" at bottom, offset to right	12-345	1 to approximately 65-000	
	1933	Embossed red serial on golden yellow plate; embossed Zia sun symbol at left with "33" in the center; "NEW MEXICO" centered at bottom	none	12-345	1 to approximately 65-000	
	1934	Embossed yellow serial on red plate; embossed Zia sun symbol at left with "34" in the center; "NEW MEXICO" centered at bottom	none	12-345	1 to approximately 67-000	
	1935	Embossed white serial on dark blue plate; embossed Zia sun symbol at left with "35" in the center; "NEW MEXICO" centered at bottom	none	12-345	1 to approximately 76-000	
	1936	Embossed dark blue serial on white plate; embossed Zia sun symbol at left with "36" in the center; "NEW MEXICO" centered at bottom	none	12-345	1 to approximately 86-000	
	1937	Embossed maroon serial on turquoise plate; embossed Zia sun symbol at left with "37" in the center; "NEW MEXICO" centered at bottom	none	12-345	1 to approximately 91-000	
	1938	Embossed black serial on yellow plate; embossed Zia sun symbol at left with "38" in the center; "NEW MEXICO" centered at bottom	none	12-345	1 to approximately 92-000	
	1939	Embossed black serial on orange plate; embossed Zia sun symbol at left with "39" in the center; "NEW MEXICO" centered at bottom	none	12-345	1 to approximately 93-000	
	1940	Embossed yellow serial on red plate; embossed Zia sun symbol at left with "1540" above and "1940" below; "NEW MEXICO" centered at bottom	"CORONADO CUARTO CENTENNIAL" at top	12-345	1 to approximately 96-000	Commemorated the 400th anniversary of the expedition of Francisco Vázquez de Coronado.
	1941	Embossed red serial on golden yellow plate; embossed Zia sun symbol at left with "41" in the center; "NEW MEXICO" centered at bottom	"THE LAND OF ENCHANTMENT" at top	12-345	1 to approximately 99-000	First use of the "Land of Enchantment" slogan.
	1942–43	Embossed black serial on white plate; embossed Zia sun symbol at left with "42" in the center; "NEW MEXICO" centered at bottom	"THE LAND OF ENCHANTMENT" at top	12-345; 123456	1 to approximately 102000	Revalidated for 1943 with windshield stickers, due to metal conservation for World War II.
	1944	Embossed white serial on black plate; embossed Zia sun symbol at left with "44" in the center; "NEW MEXICO" centered at bottom	"THE LAND OF ENCHANTMENT" at top	12-345	1 to approximately 79-000	
	1945	Embossed white serial on blue plate; embossed Zia sun symbol at left with "45" in the center; "NEW MEXICO" centered at bottom	"THE LAND OF ENCHANTMENT" at top	12-345	1 to approximately 88-000	
	1946	Embossed red serial on yellow plate; embossed Zia sun symbol at left with "46" in the center; "NEW MEXICO" centered at bottom	"THE LAND OF ENCHANTMENT" at top	12-345	1 to approximately 94-000	
	1947	Embossed yellow serial on maroon plate; embossed Zia sun symbol used as separator with "47" in the center; "NEW MEXICO" centered at bottom	"THE LAND OF ENCHANTMENT" at top	1-12345; 10-1234	Coded by county of issuance (1 or 10)	
	1948	Embossed white serial on azure plate; embossed Zia sun symbol used as separator with "48" in the center; "NEW MEXICO" centered at bottom	"THE LAND OF ENCHANTMENT" at top	1-12345; 10-1234	Coded by county of issuance (1 or 10)	
	1949	Embossed azure serial on waffle-textured white plate; embossed Zia sun symbol used as separator with "49" in the center; "NEW MEXICO" centered at bottom	"THE LAND OF ENCHANTMENT" at top	1-12345; 10-1234	Coded by county of issuance (1 or 10)	
	1950	As 1948 base, but with "50" in the center of the Zia sun symbol	"THE LAND OF ENCHANTMENT" at top	1-12345; 10-1234	Coded by county of issuance (1 or 10)	
	1951	As 1949 base, but on smooth metal, and with narrower dies and "51" in the center of the Zia sun symbol	"THE LAND OF ENCHANTMENT" at top	1-12345; 10-1234	Coded by county of issuance (1 or 10)	
	1952	Embossed red serial with Zia sun symbol separator on white plate; "NEW MEXICO" centered at bottom; "52" at top left	"LAND OF ENCHANTMENT" at top, offset to right	1-12345; 10-1234	Coded by county of issuance (1 or 10)	
	1953	Embossed white serial with Zia sun symbol separator on red plate with border line; "NEW MEXICO" centered at bottom; "53" at top left	"LAND OF ENCHANTMENT" at top, offset to right	1-12345; 10-1234	Coded by county of issuance (1 or 10)	
	1954	Embossed red serial with Zia sun symbol separator on white plate with border line; "NEW MEXICO" centered at bottom; "54" at top left	"LAND OF ENCHANTMENT" at top, offset to right	1-12345; 10-1234	Coded by county of issuance (1 or 10)	
	1955	Embossed golden yellow serial with Zia sun symbol separator on maroon plate with border line; "NEW MEXICO" centered at bottom; "55" at top left	"LAND OF ENCHANTMENT" at top, offset to right	1-12345; 10-1234	Coded by county of issuance (1 or 10)	
	1956	Embossed white serial with Zia sun symbol separator on maroon plate with border line; "56 NEW MEXICO 56" at bottom	"LAND OF ENCHANTMENT" centered at top	1-12345; 10-1234	Coded by county of issuance (1 or 10)	
	1957	Embossed green serial with Zia sun symbol separator on white plate with border line; "57 NEW MEXICO 57" at bottom	"LAND OF ENCHANTMENT" centered at top	1-12345; 10-1234	Coded by county of issuance (1 or 10)	
	1958	Embossed red serial with Zia sun symbol separator on golden yellow plate with border line; "NEW MEXICO" centered at bottom; "58" at bottom right	"LAND OF ENCHANTMENT" at top	1-12345; 1/0-1234	Coded by county of issuance (1 or 1/0)	One-digit county plates had the slogan centered, while two-digit county plates had the slogan offset to the right. This practice continued through 1971. One-digit county plates additionally had "19" embossed at the bottom left.
	1959–60	Embossed golden yellow serial with Zia sun symbol separator on maroon plate with border line; "NEW MEXICO" centered at bottom; "59" at bottom right	"LAND OF ENCHANTMENT" at top	1-12345; 2-A1234; 1/0-12345	Coded by county of issuance (1 or 1/0)	One-digit county plates additionally had "19" embossed at the bottom left. One-letter, four-digit serials issued in Bernalillo County after 2-99999 was reached. Revalidated for 1960 with white stickers on maroon tabs.

=== 1961 to present ===
Image(s)	Dates issued	Design	Slogan	Serial format	Serials issued	Notes
	1961–64	Embossed red serial with Zia sun symbol separator on white plate with border line; "NEW MEXICO" centered at bottom	"LAND OF ENCHANTMENT" at top	1-12345; 2-A1234; 1/0-12345	Coded by county of issuance (1 or 1/0)	
	1965–69	Embossed red serial with Zia sun symbol separator on yellow plate with border line; "NEW MEXICO" centered at bottom	"LAND OF ENCHANTMENT" at top	1-12345; 2-A1234; 1/0-12345	Coded by county of issuance (1 or 1/0)	One-digit county plates had "65" embossed at the bottom left.
	1969–71	As above, but with "NEW MEXICO USA" at bottom	"LAND OF ENCHANTMENT" at top	1-12345; 2-A1234; 1/0-12345	Coded by county of issuance (1 or 1/0)	One-digit county plates initially had "19" embossed at the bottom left.
	1972–74	Embossed red serial with Zia sun symbol separator on white steel plate with border line; "NEW MEXICO USA" centered at bottom; "72" at bottom left	"LAND OF ENCHANTMENT" centered at top	ABC-123	AAA-001 to BCT-999	Letters I, O, Q, U and V not used in serials from 1973 onwards.
	1974	Red serial with Zia sun symbol separator on white paper plate; "NEW MEXICO" centered at bottom; "74" at bottom right	"LAND OF ENCHANTMENT" centered at top	ABC-123	BCW-001 to BFC-999	Temporary plates issued due to steel shortage.
	1974	As 1972–74 plates, but aluminum rather than steel, and with "74" at bottom left	"LAND OF ENCHANTMENT" centered at top	ABC-123	BCW-001 to BFC-999	Replacements for paper plates.
	1974–76	As 1972–74 plates, but aluminum rather than steel	"LAND OF ENCHANTMENT" centered at top	ABC-123	BFD-001 to BTM-999	
	1976–78	Embossed red serial with Zia sun symbol separator on white plate; "NEW MEXICO" centered at bottom; "72" at bottom left; stamped indentation at top center for county-name sticker	"LAND OF ENCHANTMENT" centered between serial and state name	ABC-123	BTN-001 to CCW-999	
	1978–82	As above, but yellow rather than white, and without "72"	"LAND OF ENCHANTMENT" centered between serial and state name	ABC-123	CCX-001 to EGZ-999	
	1982 – mid 1988	Embossed red serial with Zia sun symbol separator on yellow plate; "New Mexico" screened in red centered below serial; stamped indentation at top center for county-name sticker	"Land of Enchantment" screened in red centered at bottom	ABC-123	EHA-001 to KAJ-999	'F' series not used.
	mid 1988 – late 1990	As above, but with "USA" added after state name	"Land of Enchantment" screened in red centered at bottom	ABC-123	KAK-001 to LKL-999	'F' series not used.
	late 1990 – early 1991	Embossed red serial with Zia sun symbol separator on yellow plate; light blue yucca graphic screened at bottom left and Native American zigzag bands screened at top corners; "New Mexico USA" screened in red centered below serial; stamped indentation at top center for county-name sticker	"Land of Enchantment" screened in light blue centered at bottom	ABC-123	LKM-001 to approximately LLL-999	Replaced all 1972–90 plates. Letter E not used in 123-ABC serial format (in addition to I, O, Q, U and V). County-name stickers discontinued sometime after 1996.
	early 1991 – mid 1997	Embossed red serial with Zia sun symbol separator on yellow plate; light blue yucca graphic screened at bottom left and Native American zigzag bands screened at top corners; "New Mexico USA" screened in red centered below serial; stamped indentation at top center for county-name sticker	"Land of Enchantment" screened in light blue centered at bottom	123-ABC	001-AAA to approximately 999-KFG	Replaced all 1972–90 plates. Letter E not used in 123-ABC serial format (in addition to I, O, Q, U and V). County-name stickers discontinued sometime after 1996.
	mid – late 1997	As above, but without yucca graphic and slogan	none	123-ABC	001-KFH to approximately 999-KHM	Erroneously made on trailer base.
	late 1997 – early 1999	As 1990–97 plates	"Land of Enchantment" as on 1990–97 plates	123-ABC	001-KHN to approximately 999-LRK	
	early 1999 – present	As above, but with smaller dies and no stamped indentation at top center	"Land of Enchantment" as on 1990–97 plates	123-ABC	001-MAA to 275-XJX (as of January 18, 2025)	

=== Alternative passenger plates ===
The letters E, I, O, Q, U and V are not used in the serials on these plates.

Image	Dates issued	Design	Slogan	Serial format	Serials issued	Notes
	1999–2010	Embossed red serial on white, yellow and orange gradient plate; green, yellow, orange and red hot air balloon graphic screened at left with red Zia sun symbol on yellow section; "NEW MEXICO USA" screened in yellow centered at bottom	"Land of Enchantment" screened in yellow centered above state name	NM1234	NM0001 to NM9999	
	1999–2010	Embossed red serial on white, yellow and orange gradient plate; green, yellow, orange and red hot air balloon graphic screened at left with red Zia sun symbol on yellow section; "NEW MEXICO USA" screened in yellow centered at bottom	"Land of Enchantment" screened in yellow centered above state name	1NM234	0NM001 to 9NM999	
	1999–2010	Embossed red serial on white, yellow and orange gradient plate; green, yellow, orange and red hot air balloon graphic screened at left with red Zia sun symbol on yellow section; "NEW MEXICO USA" screened in yellow centered at bottom	"Land of Enchantment" screened in yellow centered above state name	12NM34	00NM01 to 99NM99	
	1999–2010	Embossed red serial on white, yellow and orange gradient plate; green, yellow, orange and red hot air balloon graphic screened at left with red Zia sun symbol on yellow section; "NEW MEXICO USA" screened in yellow centered at bottom	"Land of Enchantment" screened in yellow centered above state name	123NM4	000NM1 to 999NM9	
	1999–2010	Embossed red serial on white, yellow and orange gradient plate; green, yellow, orange and red hot air balloon graphic screened at left with red Zia sun symbol on yellow section; "NEW MEXICO USA" screened in yellow centered at bottom	"Land of Enchantment" screened in yellow centered above state name	1234NM	0001NM to 9999NM	
	1999–2010	Embossed red serial on white, yellow and orange gradient plate; green, yellow, orange and red hot air balloon graphic screened at left with red Zia sun symbol on yellow section; "NEW MEXICO USA" screened in yellow centered at bottom	"Land of Enchantment" screened in yellow centered above state name	AB 123	AA 001 to BZ 999	
	1999–2010	Embossed red serial on white, yellow and orange gradient plate; green, yellow, orange and red hot air balloon graphic screened at left with red Zia sun symbol on yellow section; "NEW MEXICO USA" screened in yellow centered at bottom	"Land of Enchantment" screened in yellow centered above state name	ABC123	CAA001 to LGP999	
	2010–16	Embossed yellow serial on turquoise plate with border line; yellow and red Zia sun symbol embossed in the center; "NEW MEXICO" screened in white centered below serial	"CENTENNIAL 1912-2012" screened in white centered at top; "LAND OF ENCHANTMENT" screened in yellow centered at bottom	ABC-123	LGR-001 to NZT-499	Awarded "Plate of the Year" for best new license plate of 2010 by the Automobile License Plate Collectors Association, the first time New Mexico was so honored.
	2016–present	As above, but with "NEW MEXICO USA" below serial, and without Centennial slogan	"LAND OF ENCHANTMENT" as above, but at top	ABC-123	NZT-500 to SBC-521 (as of January 28, 2025)	'W' series of serials used on mail-order plates.
	July 2017 – present	Embossed yellow serial on black plate with border line; green and red chili peppers screened at left; "New Mexico USA" screened in red centered below serial	"CHILE CAPITAL OF THE WORLD" screened in yellow centered at top; "Land of Enchantment" screened in green centered at bottom	ABCD12	AAAA01 to CAFX50 (as of February 2, 2025)	Awarded "Plate of the Year" for best new license plate of 2017 by the Automobile License Plate Collectors Association, the second time New Mexico was so honored. 'W' series of serials used on mail-order plates.

== Optional plates ==
Image	Type	Dates issued	Design	Slogan	Serial format	Serials issued	Notes
	Organ Donation Awareness		As yucca passenger plate, but with "Donate Life" logo at left	"Land of Enchantment" as on yucca passenger plate, plus "Organ Donors Save Lives" screened in red centered at top	1234L/F/E	0001L/F/E to ?	
	Support Our Troops	c. 2007 – present	Embossed blue serial on graphic plate with national flag at left, bald eagle in center, and state flag at right; "New Mexico USA" screened in blue centered at bottom	"Support Our Troops" screened in blue centered between serial and state name	12345U/S	0001U/S to 94785U/S (as of June 21, 2023)	Officially known as the Patriot plate.

== Non-passenger plates ==
Image	Type	Dates issued	Design	Slogan	Serial format	Serials issued	Notes
	Trailer	1971–74	Embossed white serial with Zia sun symbol separator on reflective pale green plate with border line; "NEW MEXICO USA" at bottom	"LAND OF ENCHANTMENT" at top	T-12345	T-1 to approximately T-64500	"Trailer" and "Rec. Vehicle" printed on stickers.
	Trailer	1975–77	Embossed red serial with Zia sun symbol separator on reflective yellow plate with border line; "N.M." at top left; "75" at bottom right	"LAND OF ENCHANTMENT" at bottom, offset to left	TB-1234	TA-0001 to TF-9999	
	Trailer	1977–78	As 1978–82 passenger plates, but with "75" at bottom left	"LAND OF ENCHANTMENT" as on 1978–82 passenger plates	TB-1234	TG-0001 to TG-9999	
	Trailer	1978–82	As 1978–82 passenger plates, without "75"	"LAND OF ENCHANTMENT" as on 1978–82 passenger plates	TB-1234	TH-0001 to TM-7000	
	Trailer	1982–87	As 1982–88 passenger plates, with "New Mexico" below serial	"Land of Enchantment" as on 1982–90 passenger plates	TB-1234	TM-7001 to TW-9999; TY-0001 to TZ-9999	
	Trailer	1987–90	As 1982–88 passenger plates, with "New Mexico" below serial	"Land of Enchantment" as on 1982–90 passenger plates	T/R C-1234	T/R A-0001 to approximately T/R D-9999	
	Trailer	1990	As 1988–90 passenger plates, with "New Mexico USA" below serial	"Land of Enchantment" as on 1982–90 passenger plates	T/R C-1234	T/R E-0001 to approximately T/R E-5000	
	Truck	1961–63	Embossed green serial with Zia sun symbol separator on reflective white plate with border line; "NEW MEXICO" at bottom	"LAND OF ENCHANTMENT" at top	1-12345; 1/0-12345	Coded by county of issuance (1 or 1/0)	
	Truck	1964–65	Embossed black serial with Zia sun symbol separator on reflective yellow plate with border line; "NEW MEXICO" at bottom	"LAND OF ENCHANTMENT" at top	1-12345; 1/0-12345	Coded by county of issuance (1 or 1/0)	
	Truck	1966–70	Embossed navy blue serial with Zia sun symbol separator on reflective white plate with border line; "NEW MEXICO" at bottom	"LAND OF ENCHANTMENT" at top	1-12345; 1/0-12345	Coded by county of issuance (1 or 1/0)	
	Truck	1971–74	Embossed white serial with Zia sun symbol separator on reflective pale green plate with border line; "NEW MEXICO USA" at bottom	"LAND OF ENCHANTMENT" at top	1-12345; 1/0-12345	Coded by county of issuance (1 or 1/0)	
	Truck	1975–77	Embossed red serial with Zia sun symbol separator on reflective yellow plate with border line; "N.M." at top left; "75" at bottom right	"LAND OF ENCHANTMENT" at bottom, offset to left	AB-1234	AA-0001 to CA-5000	
	Truck	1977–78	As 1978–82 passenger plates, but with "75" at bottom left	"LAND OF ENCHANTMENT" as on 1978–82 passenger plates	AB-1234	CA-5001 to CJ-9999	
	Truck	1978–82	As 1978–82 passenger plates, without "75"	"LAND OF ENCHANTMENT" as on 1978–82 passenger plates	AB-1234	CK-0001 to GD-9999	
	Truck	1982–88	As 1982–88 passenger plates, with "New Mexico" below serial	"Land of Enchantment" as on 1982–90 passenger plates	AB-1234	GE-0001 to approximately KT-9999	
	Truck	1988–90	As 1988–90 passenger plates, with "New Mexico USA" below serial	"Land of Enchantment" as on 1982–90 passenger plates	AB-1234	KW-0001 to approximately MG-4000	Truck plates discontinued 1991; passenger plates issued to trucks since.
	State police	2017–present	Black base.				

== County coding, 1947–74 ==
New Mexico established a numeric county-code system for its passenger and truck plates in 1947. Santa Fe County was assigned code 1, while the remaining counties were assigned codes 2 through 31 in order of the number of registered vehicles in the county. Following shifts in these numbers, codes 2 through 31 were re-allocated in 1948, after which they remained constant. Los Alamos County was created in 1949, and subsequently assigned code 32.

The codes were discontinued on passenger plates in 1972, and on truck plates in 1975. From 1976 until sometime after 1996, the county of issuance was displayed on a sticker at the top of the plate.

County	1947	1948–74
Santa Fe	1	1
Bernalillo	2	2
Eddy	7	3
Chaves	3	4
Curry	5	5
Lea	4	6
Doña Ana	6	7
Grant	8	8
Colfax	10	9
Quay	11	10
Roosevelt	9	11
San Miguel	13	12
McKinley	12	13
Valencia	15	14
Otero	14	15
San Juan	18	16
Rio Arriba	19	17
Union	17	18
Luna	16	19
Taos	21	20
Sierra	22	21
Torrance	20	22
Hidalgo	24	23
Guadalupe	27	24
Socorro	25	25
Lincoln	26	26
De Baca	23	27
Catron	28	28
Sandoval	29	29
Mora	31	30
Harding	30	31
Los Alamos	–	32

Cibola County was created in 1981, after the codes had been discontinued.
