= Vik =

Vik or VIK may refer to:

== Places ==
=== Finland ===
- Viikki, a neighbourhood of Helsinki, known as Vik in Swedish

=== Iceland ===
- Vík í Mýrdal, a village in southern Iceland

=== Iran ===
- Vik, Iran, a village in Zanjan Province, Iran

=== Norway ===
- Vik, Buskerud, a village in Hole municipality, Buskerud county
- Vik, Grimstad, a village in Grimstad municipality, Aust-Agder county
- Vik, Rogaland, a village in Karmøy municipality, Rogaland county
- Vik, Sortland, a village in Sortland municipality, Nordland county
- Vik, Sømna, a village in Sømna municipality, Nordland county
- Vik, Sunnfjord, a village in Sunnfjord municipality, Vestland county
- Vik, Sogn, a municipality in Vestland county, Norway.
- Vik, Trøndelag, a village in Flatanger municipality, Trøndelag county
- Vik, Vestnes, a village in Vestnes municipality, Møre og Romsdal county
- Vik Church, a church in Vik municipality, Vestland county
- Vik Church (Flatanger), a church in Flatanger municipality, Trøndelag county
- Viken (region) (Old Norse: Vík), historical district in southern Norway
- Vikøyri, a village in Vik municipality, Vestland county

=== Sweden ===
- Vik, Sweden, a village in Simrishamn Municipality in southernmost Sweden
- Vik Castle, a castle in Uppland, Sweden
- Vikbolandet, a region and peninsula in Östergötland, Sweden.

== People ==
- Vik (name), people with the first name of Vik or Vic
- Vik (surname), people with the surname Vik

== Other ==
- Vik Records, an American record label launched in 1953 as a subsidiary of RCA Victor
- ViK. Recordings, a Canadian record label established in 1998
- Viking Age (Vik), an archaeological period
- Stalag VI-K, a German World War II prisoner of war camp at Stuckenbrock

== See also ==
- Wick (disambiguation), the anglicisation of 'Vik'
- Vic (disambiguation)
