= Department of motor vehicles =

Government agency

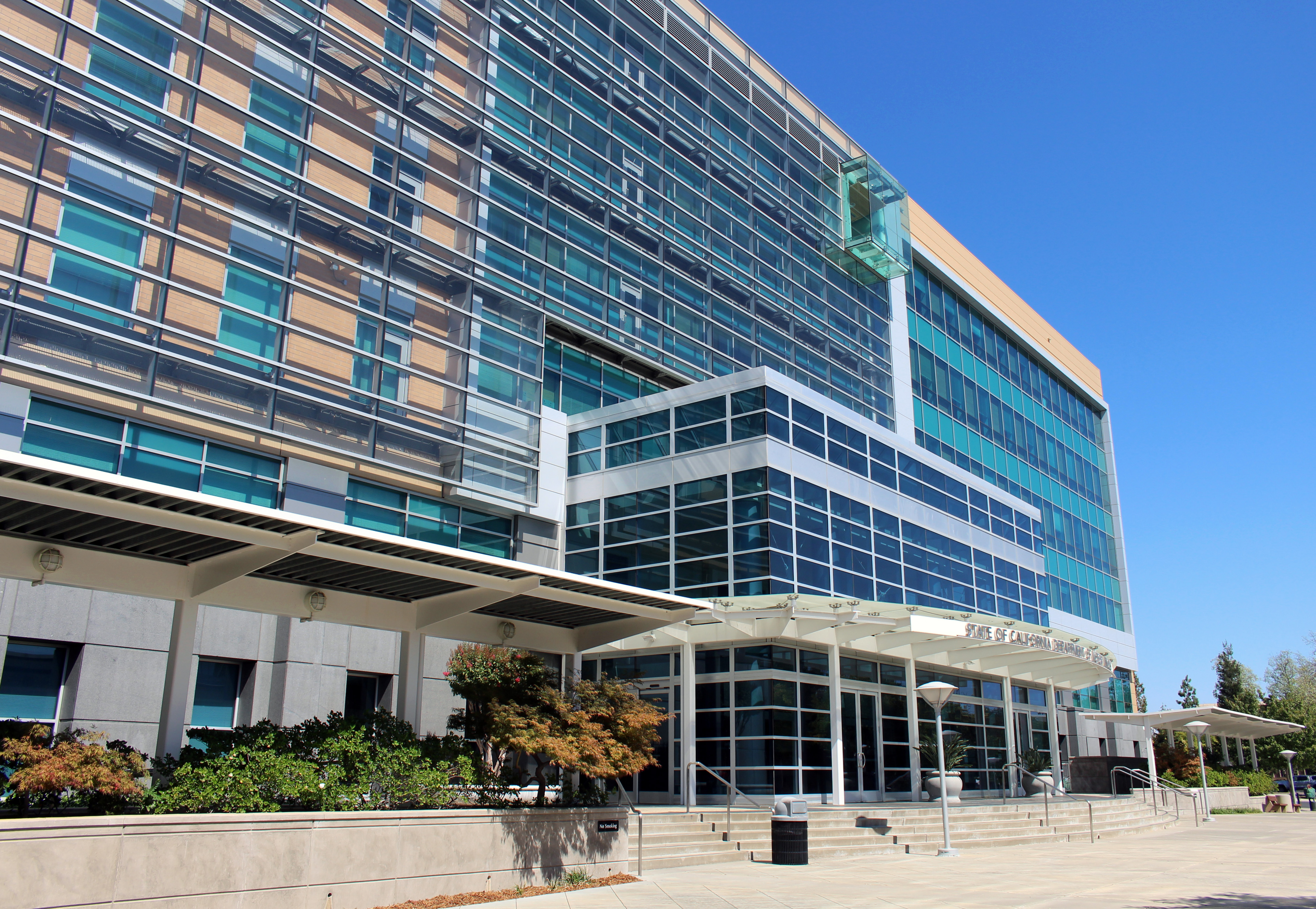
The headquarters of the largest DMV, the California Department of Motor Vehicles in Sacramento

A department of motor vehicles (DMV) is a government agency that administers motor vehicle registration and driver licensing. In countries with federal states such as in North America, these agencies are generally administered by subnational entities, while in unitary states such as many of those in Europe, DMVs are organized nationally by the central government.

== Terminology and organization ==
Driver licensing and vehicle registration in the United States are handled by the state government in all states but Hawaii, where the states' local governments perform DMV functions. In Canada, driver licensing and vehicle registration are handled at the provincial government level.

=== United States ===
The Uniform Vehicle Code prefers the name "Department of Motor Vehicles". The acronym "DMV" is most commonly used to describe the agency (where it exists); however, diverse titles are used in different jurisdictions.

| State / Territory | Agency responsible for | | Parent agency (and notes) |
| State / Territory | driver licenses | vehicle records | Parent agency (and notes) |
|---|---|---|---|
| Alabama | Driver License Division | Motor Vehicle Division | The Driver License Division is a division of the Alabama Department of Public Safety, whereas the Motor Vehicle Division is a division of the Alabama Department of Revenue. |
| Alaska | Division of Motor Vehicles | | Division of the Alaska Department of Administration; previously under the Alaska Department of Public Safety and the Alaska Department of Revenue |
| Arizona | Motor Vehicle Division | | Division of the Arizona Department of Transportation |
| Arkansas | Office of Motor Vehicle | | Division of the Arkansas Department of Finance and Administration. The Arkansas State Police is responsible for all driver testing. |
| California | Department of Motor Vehicles | | Department of the cabinet-level California State Transportation Agency |
| Colorado | Division of Motor Vehicles | | Division of the Colorado Department of Revenue |
| Connecticut | Department of Motor Vehicles | | |
| Delaware | Division of Motor Vehicles | | Division of the Delaware Department of Transportation |
| District of Columbia | Department of Motor Vehicles | | |
| Florida | Department of Highway Safety and Motor Vehicles | | |
| Georgia | Department of Driver Services | Motor Vehicle Division | The Motor Vehicle Division is a division of the Georgia Department of Revenue. |
| Hawaii | Driver License Division | Motor Vehicle Division both under the Honolulu Department of Customer Services, Driver License Division Hawaii Department of Motor Vehicle Now Maui County Motor Vehicle -Licensing Drivers License Division Motor Vehicles Division both under the Kauai County Department of Motor Vehicles | Hawaii is the only U.S. state where no part of the state government performs DMV functions; it has completely delegated vehicle registration and driver licensing to local governments (i.e. the City and County of Honolulu; Hawai'i, Maui, and Kaua'i counties). |
| Idaho | Division of Motor Vehicles | | Division of the Idaho Transportation Department |
| Illinois | Driver Services Department | Vehicle Services Department | Departments of the Illinois Secretary of State |
| Indiana | Bureau of Motor Vehicles | | |
| Iowa | Motor Vehicle Division | | Division of the Iowa Motor Vehicle Division and the Iowa Department of Transportation |
| Kansas | Division of Vehicles | | Division of the Kansas Department of Revenue |
| Kentucky | Division of Driver Licensing | Motor Vehicle Licensing System | Divisions of the Kentucky Transportation Cabinet. The state's Circuit Court Clerks offices are responsible for the registration and issuance of drivers licenses while the County Clerks are responsible for vehicle registrations and titles. The Transportation Cabinet is responsible for establishing the policies and designs for licenses and vehicle registration. The Kentucky State Police Driver Testing Branch is responsible for driver testing. |
| Louisiana | Office of Motor Vehicles | | Division of the Louisiana Department of Public Safety and Corrections |
| Maine | Bureau of Motor Vehicles | | Division of the Maine Secretary of State |
| Maryland | Motor Vehicle Administration | | Division of the Maryland Department of Transportation |
| Massachusetts | Registry of Motor Vehicles | | Division of the Massachusetts Department of Transportation; transferred from the Executive Office of Transportation effective November 1, 2009 |
| Michigan | Michigan Secretary of State | | Michigan is the only state to not have an Official Department of Motor Vehicles. |
| Minnesota | Driver and Vehicle Services | | Division of the Minnesota Department of Public Safety |
| Mississippi | Department of Public Safety | Motor Vehicle Licensing Division | Driver licensing is handled by the Mississippi Department of Public Safety, while the Motor Vehicle Licensing Division is a division of the Mississippi Department of Revenue. |
| Missouri | Missouri Department of Revenue | | |
| Montana | Motor Vehicle Division | | Division of the Montana Department of Justice |
| Nebraska | Department of Motor Vehicles | | |
| Nevada | Department of Motor Vehicles | | Formerly the "Department of Motor Vehicles and Public Safety" |
| New Hampshire | Division of Motor Vehicles | | Division of the New Hampshire Department of Safety |
| New Jersey | Motor Vehicle Commission | | New Jersey has differing titles for the high office holders in this part of the state government: the head of the New Jersey Department of Transportation is referred to as the "Commissioner," while the head of the MVC is referred to as the "Chief Administrator." |
| New Mexico | Motor Vehicle Division | | Division of the New Mexico Taxation and Revenue Department. |
| New York | Department of Motor Vehicles | | |
| North Carolina | Division of Motor Vehicles | | Division of the North Carolina Department of Transportation |
| North Dakota | Driver License Division | Motor Vehicle Division | Divisions of the North Dakota Department of Transportation |
| Ohio | Bureau of Motor Vehicles | | The Bureau of Motor Vehicles is a division of the Ohio Department of Public Safety. Titles are issued at the county level by the Clerk of Courts. |
| Oklahoma | Department of Public Safety | Tax Commission | Driver licensing is handled by the Oklahoma Department of Public Safety, while the Oklahoma Tax Commission handles vehicle registrations and titles. Vehicle registration services are semi-privatized in Oklahoma, with businesses providing registration services having been called "tag agencies" until 2023. |
| Oregon | Driver and Motor Vehicle Services | | Division of the Oregon Department of Transportation |
| Pennsylvania | Driver and Vehicle Services | | Division of the Pennsylvania Department of Transportation (PennDOT) |
| Rhode Island | Division of Motor Vehicles | | Division of the Rhode Island Department of Revenue |
| South Carolina | Department of Motor Vehicles | | |
| South Dakota | Department of Public Safety | Department of Revenue | |
| Tennessee | Driver License Services | Vehicle Services Division | The Vehicle Services Division is a division of the Tennessee Department of Revenue; the Driver License Services division is a division of the Tennessee Department of Safety and Homeland Security. The state's county clerks are responsible for the registration and issuance of drivers licenses, vehicle registrations, and titles, while the Department of Revenue and Department of Safety are responsible for establishing the policies and designs for vehicle registration and licenses, respectively. |
| Texas | Driver License Division | Department of Motor Vehicles | Vehicle titles and registration were formerly provided by the Texas Department of Transportation, however these services were transferred to the new Texas Department of Motor Vehicles (TxDMV), effective November 1, 2009. The Driver License Division is a division of the Texas Department of Public Safety. |
| Utah | Driver License Services | Division of Motor Vehicles | The Driver License Services division is a division of the Utah Department of Public Safety and the Division of Motor Vehicles is a division of the Utah State Tax Commission |
| Vermont | Department of Motor Vehicles | | Subunit of the Vermont Agency of Transportation |
| Virginia | Department of Motor Vehicles | | |
| Washington | Department of Licensing | | Also handles Boat, Business, and Professional licenses |
| West Virginia | Division of Motor Vehicles | | Division of the West Virginia Department of Transportation |
| Wisconsin | Division of Motor Vehicles | | Division of the Wisconsin Department of Transportation |
| Wyoming | Driver Services Program | | Division of the Wyoming Department of Transportation (WyDot) |
| American Samoa | Department of Public Safety | | |
| Guam | Motor Vehicle Division | Department of Revenue and Taxation | |
| Northern Mariana Islands | Driver's License Section | Bureau of Motor Vehicles | The Driver's License Section division is a division of the Bureau of Motor Vehicles, which is a division of the Northern Mariana Islands Department of Public Safety and vehicle registration and title is handled by the Department of Public Safety. |
| Puerto Rico | Driver Services Directorate | | The Driver Services Directorate is part of the Department of Transportation and Public Works (Departamento de Transportación y Obras Públicas). Prior to 1975, it was known as the "Motor Vehicles Area" of the Department (Area de Vehículos de Motor in Spanish). |
| United States Virgin Islands | Motor Vehicle Bureau | | Division of the United States Virgin Islands Police Department |

==== Organization within state government ====
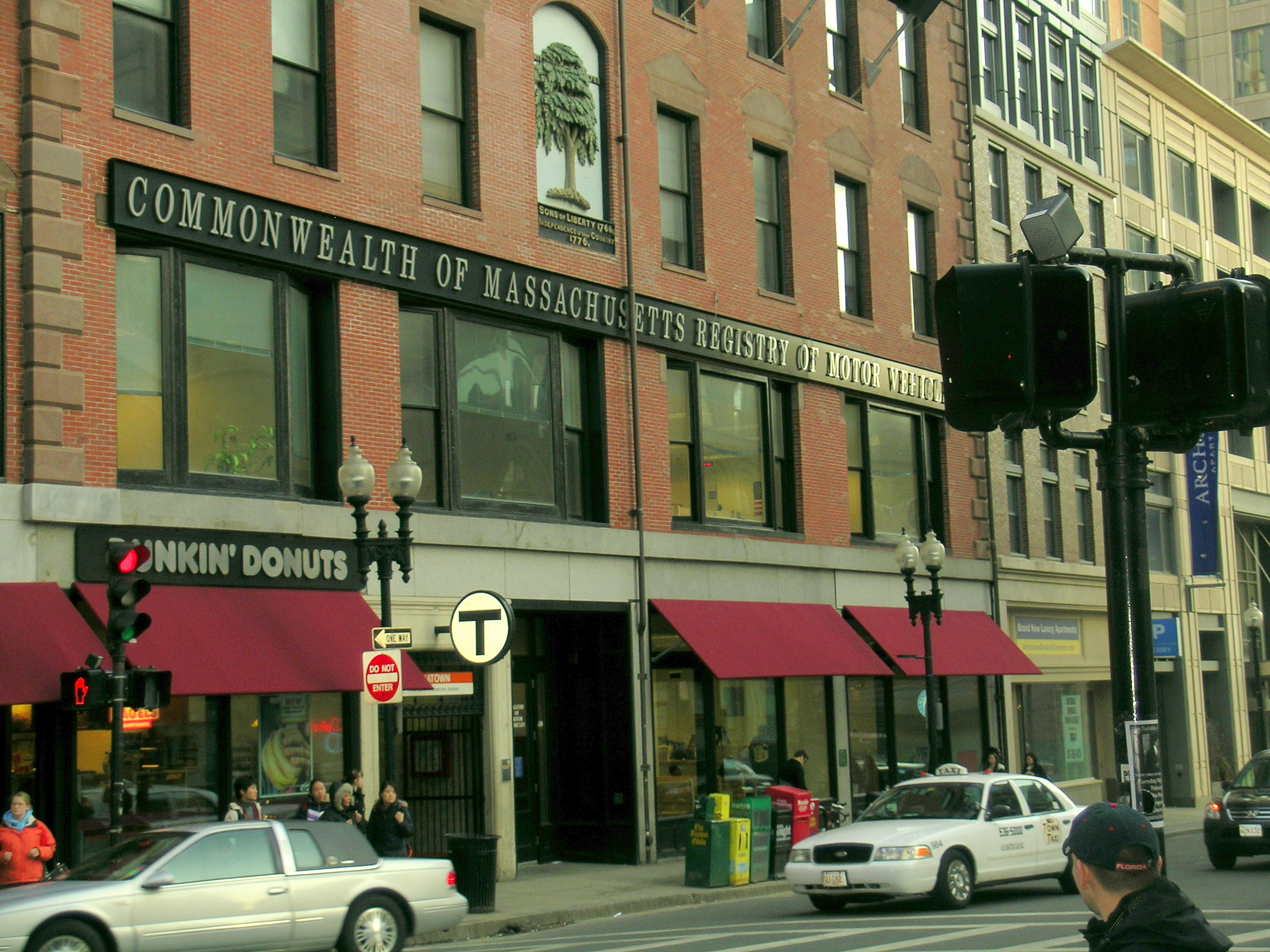
Former location of the Massachusetts Registry of Motor Vehicles on Washington Street in Boston's Chinatown

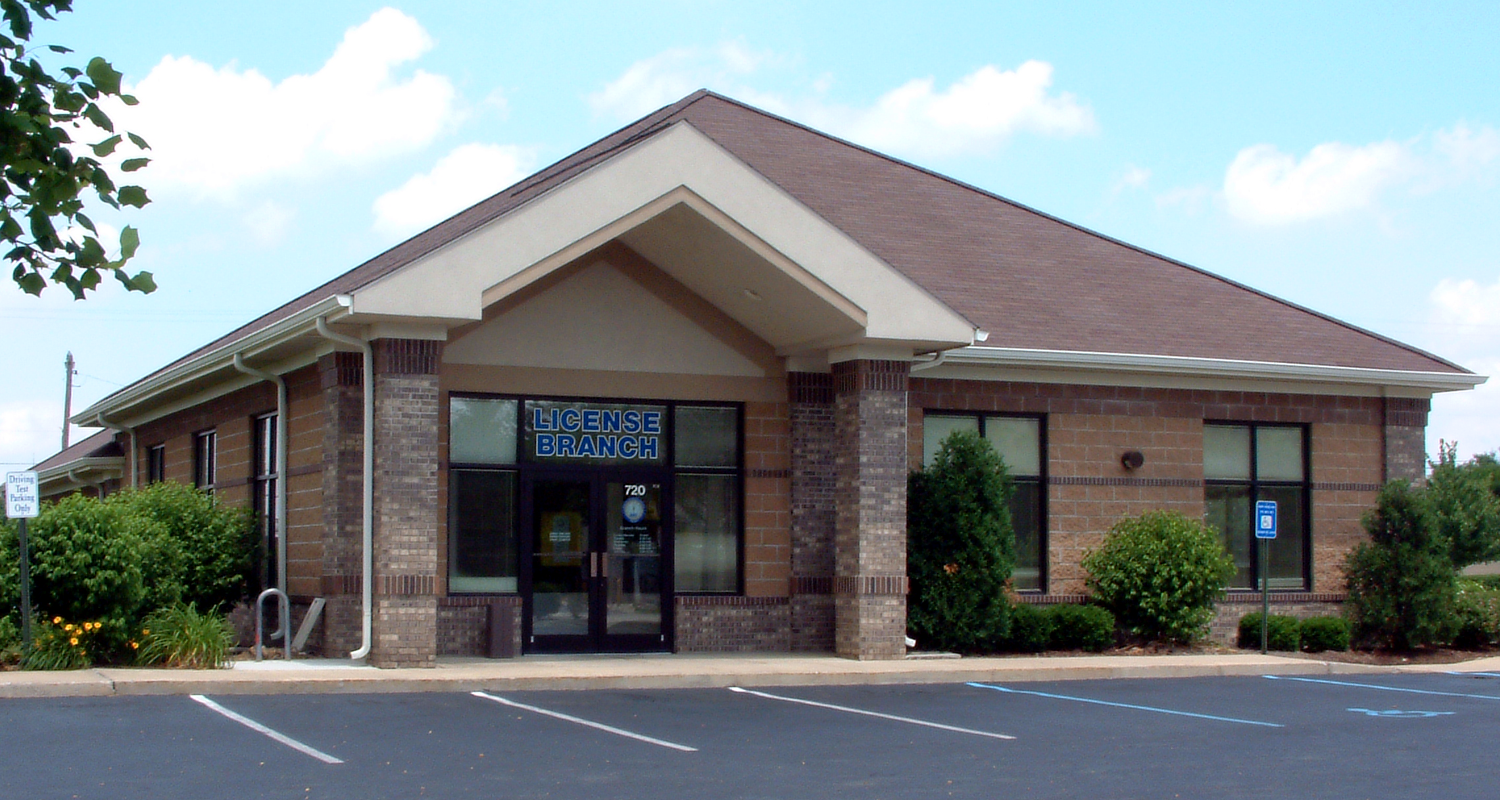
A BMV license branch in West Lafayette, Indiana

The location of a department or division of motor vehicles within the structure of a state's government tends to vary widely.

Hawaii is the only U.S. state where no part of the statewide government performs DMV functions; it has completely delegated vehicle registration and driver licensing to its county governments.

In Kentucky, the Transportation Cabinet sets the policies and designs for licenses and vehicle registration; but the actual registration and licensing are handled by its county clerks' (vehicle registration) and Circuit Court clerks' (drivers licensing) offices. Likewise, in Tennessee, the Department of Revenue and the Driver License Services Division of the Department of Safety and Homeland Security establishes policies and designs for licenses and vehicle registration, but the actual registration and licensing are handled by its county clerks.

In the District of Columbia, which is not part of any state, the DMV (formerly the Bureau of Motor Vehicle Services) is part of the city government.

In Virginia, the Department of Motor Vehicles handles both driver licensing and vehicle registration, while the Virginia State Police and the Department of Environmental Quality administer safety inspection and emission inspection, respectively. The program is simply administered by the state; actual inspections are performed by specific authorized employees of privately owned gas stations and garages licensed by the state.

In some states, the DMV is not a separate cabinet-level department, but instead is a division or bureau within a larger department. Departments that perform DMV functions include the Department of Justice (Montana), the Department of Public Safety (Texas, Ohio), the Department of Revenue (Missouri, Kansas, and Colorado), and the Department of Transportation (Arizona, Delaware, Maryland, North Carolina, Oregon, Pennsylvania, and Wisconsin). In New Hampshire and Tennessee, the Division of Motor Vehicles and the Driver License Services Division, respectively, is a division of each state's Department of Safety (in Tennessee, Department of Safety and Homeland Security). In Vermont, the Department of Motor Vehicles is a subunit of the state Agency of Transportation.

Some states do not separate DMV functions into distinct organizational entities at all, but simply bundle them into responsibilities assigned to an existing government agency. For example, in the state of Washington, the Department of Licensing is responsible for driver's licenses and vehicle and boat registrations in addition to most other business and occupational licensing. In Maine, Michigan, and Illinois, the Secretary of State's offices perform responsibilities that would be handled by the DMV in other states.

==== Jurisdiction and exceptions ====
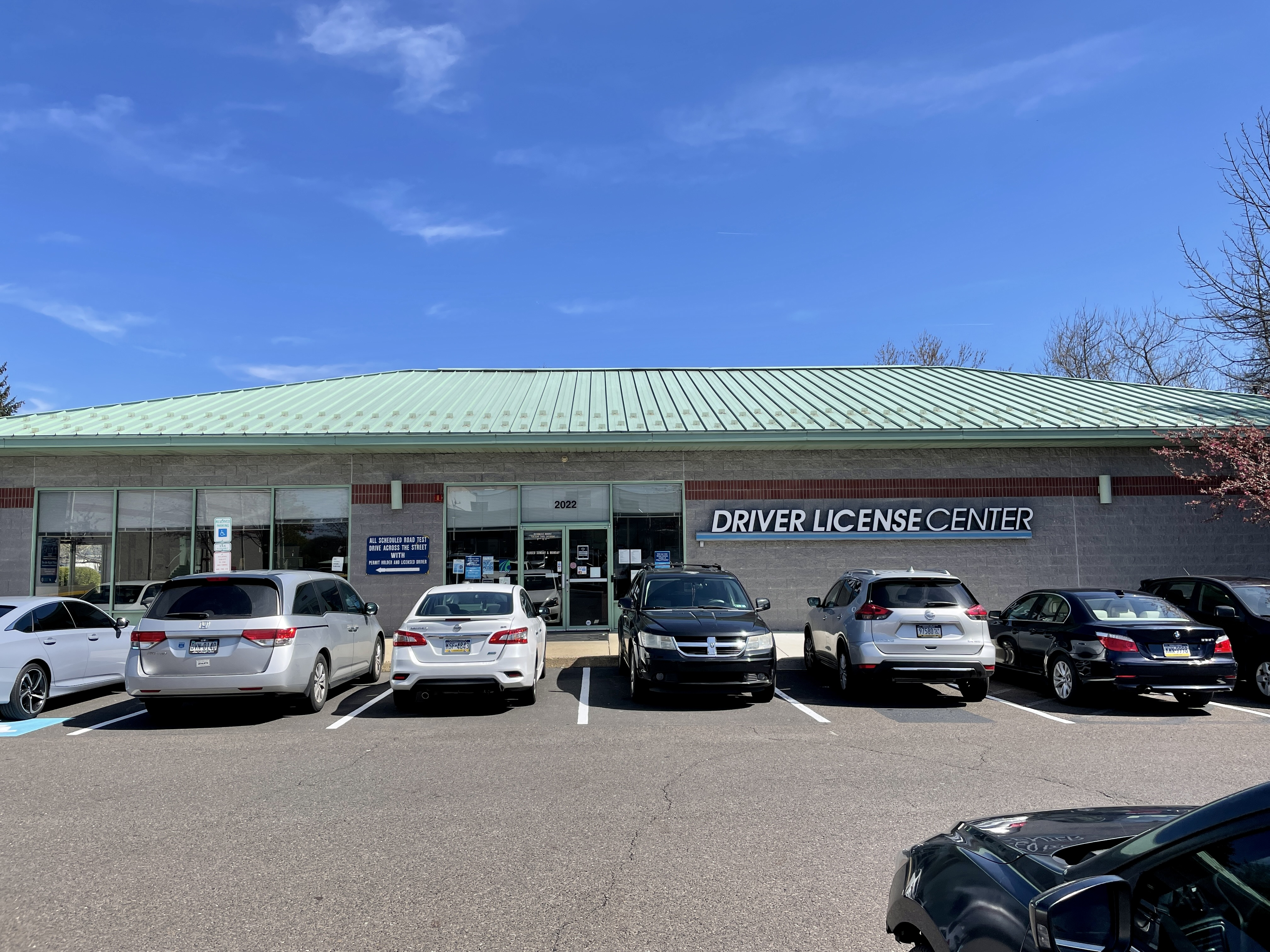
PennDOT Driver License Center in Huntingdon Valley, Pennsylvania

Almost all long-term residents ("long term" in this case means over 30 days) of a state who wish to operate motor vehicles must possess a driver's license issued by their state DMV, and their vehicles must show license plates (and current registration tags or stickers) issued by that agency.

Armed Forces active duty service members are an exception to this general rule; by federal law, servicemembers do not change legal residence when relocating to a new duty station unless they take voluntary action to do so. These individuals have the option of retaining the license and vehicle registration of their legal residence or obtaining a new license and registration locally. Some states also let out-of-state college students maintain their existing license and/or registration.

The federal government registers vehicles which it owns or leases through the General Services Administration (GSA), a federal agency, rather than with any state or territorial DMV. GSA contracts with Federal Prison Industries for the manufacturing of "U.S. Government" plates to be mounted on such vehicles. However, federal employees authorized to drive such vehicles must still be licensed by their home state or territory.

The Office of Foreign Missions at the U.S. Department of State has a Diplomatic Motor Vehicles program that issues driver's licenses to foreign diplomats and their dependents, registers their vehicles, and issues special diplomatic license plates.

=== Canada ===
| Province/Territory | Agency names | Notes |
|---|---|---|
| Alberta | Service Alberta | |
| British Columbia | Insurance Corporation of British Columbia | |
| Manitoba | Manitoba Public Insurance Corporation | |
| New Brunswick | Department of Public Safety's Motor Vehicle Branch | |
| Newfoundland | Motor Registration Division | |
| Nova Scotia | Registry of Motor Vehicles | |
| Ontario | Ministry of Transportation (MTO) | Front-line services provided at ServiceOntario (license reissuance and vehicle registration) or DriveTest (driver testing) offices. |
| Québec | Société de l'assurance automobile du Québec (English: Quebec Automobile Insurance Corporation) | Also performs inspections and seizures of maritime vehicles throughout the province on waterways such as the Gulf of St. Lawrence and the Ottawa River. |
| Prince Edward Island | Prince Edward Island Department of Transportation and Public Works' Highway Safety Division | |
| Saskatchewan | Saskatchewan Government Insurance | |
| Northwest Territories | Northwest Territories Department of Transportation's Motor Vehicle Division | |
| Nunavut | Division of Motor Vehicles | |
| Yukon | Yukon Territory Community and Transportation Services' Motor Vehicle Department | |

=== Mexico ===
| Federal entity | Agency names | Notes |
|---|---|---|
| Jalisco | Secretaría de Movilidad y Transporte (Secretariat of Mobility and Transportation) | |
| Nuevo León | Instituto de Control Vehicular (Vehicle Control Institute) | |
| Mexico City | Secretaría de Movilidad de la CDMX (Secretariat of Mobility of Mexico City) | |
| Nayarit | Secretaría de Movilidad del estado de Nayarit (Secretariat of Mobility of Nayarit state) | |

=== Europe ===
| Country | Agency names | Notes |
|---|---|---|
| Andorra | Government of Andorra (in Catalan) | plates provided by the Automobile club of Andorra |
| France | D.R.I.R.E (in French) | |
| Germany | Straßenverkehrsbehörde / Kraftfahrzeug-Zulassungsbehörde (in German) | |
| Ireland | Driving tests — Road Safety Authority (RSA); Driving licences — National Driver Licence Service, managed by the RSA; Registration number plates — National VRT Services, within the Revenue Commissioners; Change of ownership notification — Vehicle Registration Unit, within the Department of Transport; Roadworthiness certification — provided by Applus+, as National Car Testing Services Ltd., under contract to the RSA | |
| Latvia | Ceļu satiksmes drošības direkcija (CSDD, Road Traffic Safety Directorate) | Driver licensing, vehicle registration and inspection in Latvia |
| Netherlands | Rijksdienst voor het Wegverkeer (in Dutch) (vehicle registration and title) and Centraal Bureau voor de afgifte van Rijvaardigheidsbewijzen (in Dutch) (driver licensing) | |
| Portugal | Instituto da Mobilidade e dos Transportes (IMT) | Driver licensing and vehicle registration in Portugal |
| Romania | Direcția Regim Permise de Conducere și Înmatriculare a Vehiculelor (DRPCIV, Directorate of Driving Licence Regimes and Registration of Vehicles) | Driver licensing and vehicle registration in Romania |
| Russia | State Automobile Inspectorate | |
| Spain | Directorate General of Traffic | Driver licensing and vehicle registration in Spain |
| Sweden | Swedish Transport Agency | Driver licensing and vehicle registration in Sweden |
| United Kingdom | Driver and Vehicle Licensing Agency (DVLA) | Driver and Vehicle Agency in Northern Ireland |

== Areas of responsibility ==
=== Driver's licenses and identification ===
In countries with no national identification card (like the United States), driver's licenses have often become the de facto identification card for many purposes, and DMV agencies have effectively become the agency responsible for verifying identity in their respective states, even the identity of non-drivers. The REAL ID Act of 2005 is an attempt to provide a national standard for identification cards in the United States as identification cards are commonly used in everyday life.

=== Driver certification ===
In some states, besides conducting the written and hands-on driving tests that are a prerequisite to earning a driver's license, DMVs also regulate private driving schools and their instructors. All DMVs issue their state's driver's manual, which all drivers are expected to know and abide by. Knowledge of the driver's manual is tested prior to issuing a permit or license.

=== Vehicle registration ===
DMVs are responsible for providing an identification number for vehicles, either with a permanent vehicle registration plate or temporary tag. See also Vehicle registration plates of the United States. A vehicle registration program tracks detailed vehicle information, such as odometer history, to prevent automobile-related crimes such as odometer fraud.

Many DMVs allow third parties to issue registration materials. These may include companies that specialize in processing registration application paperwork (often called "tag agents") or car dealers. Tag agents are given direct access to DMV systems (as in Louisiana). Dealers often use their state DMV's electronic vehicle registration (EVR) program.

=== Vehicle ownership ===
The certification of ownership of automotive vehicles is handled by each state's DMV normally by issuing a vehicle title. The types of vehicles certified by a DMV varies by state. While almost all DMVs title vehicles that are driven on roadways, the responsibility to title boats, mobile homes, and off-road vehicles can be the responsibility of other agencies such as a Department of Natural Resources (DNR).

As the issuer of vehicle titles, DMVs are also usually responsible for recording liens made with an automobile as collateral on a secured loan. Several DMVs provide an Electronic Lien and Title program for lienholders.

=== Law enforcement ===
Duties of the DMV include enforcement of state and federal laws regarding motor vehicles. Many departments have sworn law enforcement officers who enforce DMV regulations that are codified in state law. In North Carolina, for example, the DMV contains an element known as "License and Theft." Stolen motor vehicles are tracked down by "Inspectors," sworn law enforcement officers of the state employed by the DMV, and suspected cases of fraudulent registrations, license plates, and/or theft of those elements are investigated. Inspectors also investigate independent inspection stations licensed by the DMV. At times, some of these stations violate DMV regulations codified by law. The most common of these violations is passing inspection for a vehicle with windows tinted below the legal limits. The penalty for such a violation is a $1,000 fine and, for first time offenders, a revocation of the inspection permit for 30 days. Inspection stations face permanent permit revocation for subsequent offenses. In New York, the Division of Field Investigations (DFI) is the criminal investigations arm of the DMV. It employs investigators to combat auto theft, identity theft, and fraudulent document-related crimes that take place in New York. These investigators are armed New York State peace officers with statewide authority to enforce laws and handle investigations. In Texas, the Automobile Burglary and Theft Prevention Authority (ABTPA) educates Texans on how to protect themselves from motor vehicle theft and awards financial grants to curtail auto theft and burglary. The division is also involved in a program that helps to prevent stolen motor vehicles from entering Mexico.

Compared to standard law enforcement officers, DMV law enforcement agents operate with greater flexibility when it comes to their specific police powers. If a person under investigation by the DMV refuses to answer questions or meet with DMV law enforcement agents, their registration and tags may be canceled. Although a citizen has a constitutional right not to speak or meet with sworn law enforcement officers while under investigation, no constitutional right protects a person's motor vehicle registration with a state agency. Another example of this flexibility of police powers is found in the policies of many states regarding suspected DUI offenders. If a person is stopped by police under suspicion of driving while impaired, and refuses a breath test to determine blood alcohol content, the DMV automatically revokes that person's license for one year. Even if evidence of that person's impairment is found insufficient at trial, the individual loses their driving privileges simply for having refused the sobriety test.

=== General identification ===
In most states, a separate identification card indicating residency is optionally provided in the case that one does not have a driver's license.

=== Liquor ID ===
A liquor identification is also provided in some jurisdictions for residents to affirm their age of majority to sellers of liquor, although a state-issued ID that proves the individual is over the legal drinking age often suffices. This is another measure to prevent minors from purchasing alcohol.

== Equivalent agencies in other countries ==
=== Africa ===
- Nigeria - Federal Road Safety Commission

=== Australia ===
- ACT - Road Transport Authority (Access Canberra)
- New South Wales - Transport for NSW
- Northern Territory - Motor Vehicle Registry
- Queensland - Department of Transport & Main Roads
- South Australia - Department for Infrastructure & Transport
- Tasmania - Building Tasmania
- Victoria - VicRoads
- Western Australia - Department of Transport & Major Infrastructure

=== Europe ===
- Bulgaria - Traffic Police
- Czech Republic - Odbor dopravy Obecního úřadu obce s rozšířenou působností příslušný podle místa pobytu žadatele
- Estonia - Maanteeamet
- France - Agence nationale des titres sécurisés (ANTS)
- Germany - Kraftfahrt-Bundesamt (KBA), Straßenverkehrsbehörde (handles driver's license applications/vehicle registration, part of the city or county government), TÜV/DEKRA (making obligatory every two year check of cars)
- Ireland - National driver licence service (ndls)
- Italy - Motorizzazione Civile
- Latvia CSDD Ceļu satiksmes drošības direkcija (Road and traffic safety agency)
- Lithuania - State Enterprise REGITRA
- Norway - Statens vegvesen
- Poland - Wojewódzki Ośrodek Ruchu Drogowego (Voivodeship Road Traffic Centre)
- Portugal - Instituto da Mobilidade e dos Transportes Terrestres
- Romania - Direcția regim permise de conducere și înmatriculare a vehiculelor (DRPCIV/SRPCIV)
- Spain - Dirección General de Tráfico
- Sweden - Swedish Transport Agency (Swedish: Transportstyrelsen)
- Switzerland - Although there is a federal transport department, which has offices in transportation and roads, there is no federal motor vehicle office. Such business is done locally in cantonal motoring office.

- Geneva - Service cantonal des véhicules
- Ticino - Sezione della circolazione
- Vaud - Service des automobiles et de la navigation

- United Kingdom - Driver and Vehicle Licensing Agency

- Northern Ireland - Driver & Vehicle Agency

=== North America ===
- Barbados - Barbados Licensing Authority
- Belize - individual city police departments
- Costa Rica - Consejo de Seguridad Vial
- Guatemala - Departamento de Transito
- El Salvador - Sertracen
- Mexico - Secretaría de Vialidad y Transporte (Secretariat of Traffic and Transportation; ran directly by the states rather than the federal government)
- Panama - Sertracen

=== South America ===
- Bolivia - transito of local police stations
- Brazil - At national level, DENATRAN (Departamento Nacional de Trânsito), that coordinates all governmental effort. But each state has its own DETRAN (such as DETRAN-SP, that belongs to state of São Paulo), that manages actual registration of vehicles, emission of driver's licenses, etc.
- Chile - Registro Civil for vehicle inscription, renewal of licence plates and other affairs. Local Direccción de Tránsito for drivers license examination and renewels
- Colombia - Servicios Integrales para la Movilidad
- Guyana - The Licence Office
- Ecuador - local commission de transito office
- Suriname - Drivers License Department at Bureau Nieuwe Haven
- Venezuela - Instituto Nacional de Transito Terrestre INTT

=== Asia ===
- Bangladesh - Bangladesh Road Transport Authority
- Hong Kong - Department of Transport
- India - Each Indian state operates a Transport Department. Some states, including Maharashtra, Kerala, Odisha, Gujarat, and Jammu and Kashmir, refer to them as "Motor Vehicles Department" (MVD). These departments oversee Regional Transport Offices (RTOs), handling licensing and registration activities, and are also responsible for enforcing the Motor Vehicle Act.
  - Kerala Motor Vehicles Department
- Iran - Ministry Of Roads And Transportation
- Israel - Ministry of Transport Licensing Authority
- Kuwait - Ministry of Interior General Directorate of Traffic (GDT)
- Malaysia - Road Transport Department Malaysia (JPJ Malaysia)
- Pakistan - National Highway Authority
- Philippines - Land Transportation Office
- Singapore - Land Transport Authority (LTA)
- South Korea - Metropolitan / Provincial Police
- Taiwan - Motor Vehicles Office
- Vietnam - Department for Roads of Vietnam (DRVN)
- Indonesia - One-Stop Integrated Administration System (SAMSAT) which is managed by the Indonesian National Police, the regional revenue agency, and a state-owned insurance company Jasa Raharja

=== Oceania ===
- New Zealand - NZ Transport Agency
