= Vic =

Vic, vic or VIC may refer to:

== People and fictional characters ==
- Vic (name), a list of people, fictional characters and mascots with the given name
- V.I.C. (rapper) (born 1987), stage name of a retired American rapper

== Places ==
- Vic, Spain, a town and municipality in Barcelona Province
- Victoria (state), a state in Australia abbreviated Vic
- Victoria, British Columbia, Canada, a provincial capital, sometimes shortened to just "Vic."
- Mount Vic, a mountain in British Columbia, Canada
- Vič District, Ljubljana, Slovenia
  - Vič, a former village, now part of Ljubljana
- Vič, Dravograd, a village in northern Slovenia

== Government and military ==
- Vic., abbreviation used when referring to Acts of Parliament in the United Kingdom, indicating an act during the reign of Victoria, e.g. 23 Vic
- Vehicle Identity Check, a former car ownership regulation in the UK
- Veteran identification card, issued by the United States Department of Veterans Affairs
- Vic formation, a fighter formation first used in the First World War
- Victualling Inshore Craft, a type of Royal Navy auxiliary vessel during the Second World War

== Science and technology ==
- Vicinal (chemistry), a compound geometry in chemistry
- Valve interstitial cells, the cell most prevalent in the heart valve
- Voltage-gated ion channels, proteins that carry charged ions across cell membranes
- Voice interface card, a hardware interface in telecommunications and networking
- MOS Technology VIC, or Video Interface Chip, used in the VIC-20 home computer
- Virtual interface card, a Cisco network adapter
- VMware Infrastructure Client, a software used to connect to VMware virtualization systems

== Arts and entertainment ==
- The Vic Theatre, a music venue in Chicago, Illinois opened in 1912
- Vegas Vic, an unofficial name for a Las Vegas neon sign erected in 1951
- Vic (film), a 2006 short film directed by Sage Stallone
- Villagers of Ioannina City, a Greek folk rock band formed in 2007
- VIC (TV series), a 2018 Chinese drama

== Other uses ==
- VIC, ISO 639-3 code for Virgin Islands Creole, an English-based creole language
- VIC, National Rail code of London Victoria station
- Visitor information center, a place that provides information to tourists or other visitors
- Visitor interpretive center, an institution for dissemination of knowledge of natural or cultural heritage
- Vadodara Innovation Council, a non-profit associated with National Innovation Council of India
- Vienna International Centre, the campus and building complex hosting the United Nations Office at Vienna
- Virginia Intermont College, a small private Baptist liberal arts college in Bristol, Virginia
- VIC cipher, a cipher used by Soviet spy Reino Häyhänen
- UE Vic, a Spanish football club based in Vic, Catalonia, Spain

== See also ==
- The Vic (disambiguation)
- Vick (disambiguation)
- Victor (disambiguation)
- Victoria (disambiguation)
- Vik (disambiguation)
