= Vehicle register =

The Vehicle register in the United Kingdom is a database of motor vehicles. It is a legal requirement in the UK for most types of motor vehicle to be registered if they are to be used on the public road.

All new and imported vehicles are required to be entered onto the register, which is administered by the Driver and Vehicle Licensing Agency (DVLA) in Great Britain and by Driver & Vehicle Agency (DVA) in Northern Ireland.

Registered vehicles are not provided with tax certificates anymore in the United Kingdom.

On the register, along with the vehicle details (make, model, engine capacity, colour, VIN, etc.) are recorded the details of the current keeper of the vehicle (name, address). The current keeper is issued with a registration document known as a V5C, which displays the registration details of the vehicle. Each time any of the registration details change, if the vehicle keeper is changed, or any of the vehicle details are changed, for example, the DVLA/DVLNI has to be notified, and a new document is issued.

A vehicle first registration fee has to be paid to enter a vehicle onto the register for the first time.

== Database uses ==
The database is available to the law enforcement authorities for activities such as:

- Vehicle legality checks such as: current safety certification, motor insurance and vehicle licence
- Police traffic law enforcement
- Automated camera enforcement of certain traffic laws

Details from the database are also available, for £2.50, to anyone having a good reason to require them. Between 2004 and 2009 the service sold more than 18 million names and addresses charging £44 million. The DVLA stated that they did not make a profit from the service. Commercial vehicle check companies incorporate database details Car check for consumer protection and anti-fraud purposes. In 2009, Castrol used information from the database to create personalised advertisements to drivers. Five billboards in London automatically recognised the numberplate and then advised drivers what type of engine oil to use based on the make and age of their car. The DVLA said that such use of the database was "inappropriate" and it was "urgently investigating".

== See also ==
- Vehicle Excise Duty (VED) - the UK duty, or tax, payable to be allowed to use a motor vehicle on a public road
- Vehicle licence - the UK licence issued for a motor vehicle in return for the appropriate VED having been paid
- Vehicle registration plate
- U.S. and Canadian license plates
