= Vehicle registration plates of São Tomé and Príncipe =

São Tomé and Príncipe
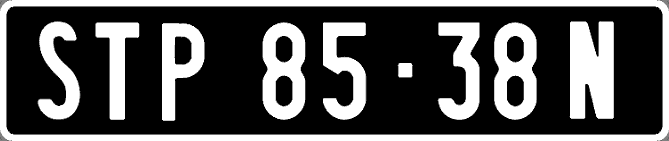
- São Toméan regular legal standard number plate.
- Country: São Tomé and Príncipe
- Country code: None

Current series
- Size: 520 mm × 110 mm 20.5 in × 4.3 in
- Serial format: Not standard
- Colour (front): White on black
- Colour (rear): White on black

The vehicle registration plates of São Tomé and Príncipe is a legal form requiring the citizens of São Tomé and Príncipe to have the car registered.

The license plate São Tomé and Príncipe repeated former Portuguese standard «STP-00-00». Since 2001, this combination added suffix with one letter. The current standard has the form «STP-12-34AA». Standard license plates made with white characters on a black background.
