= Bill of sale =

Document that transfers ownership of goods

A bill of sale is a document that transfers ownership of goods from one person to another. It is used in situations where the former owner transfers possession of the goods to a new owner. Bills of sale may be used in a wide variety of transactions: to sell goods, exchange, give, or mortgage objects. They can be used only to transfer ownership of goods that people already own or to transfer ownership of moveable tangible goods and only by individuals and unincorporated businesses.

Bills of sale exist in common law quite independently of any legislation. In England and Wales, they are regulated by two Victorian pieces of legislation: the Bills of Sale Act 1878 (41 & 42 Vict. c. 31) and the Bills of Sale Act (1878) Amendment Act 1882 (45 & 46 Vict. c. 43). This area of the law was subject to review by the Law Commission, which published a proposal for change in 2017.

== United States ==
=== Historical origin ===
The term "bill of sale" originally referred to any writing by which an absolute disposition of personalty for value was effected or evidenced. A common feature of such dispositions is that the owner mortgagor remains in possession and exercises all the attendant rights of ownership, which may be so overwhelming as to induce a third party to accept the same chattel as security for a grant, albeit without notice of the first mortgagee. This scenario made the bill of sale a veritable tool of fraud.

The evolution of various bills of sale laws, within the US, was to curb the use of the bill of sale as a means of defrauding innocent persons.

A bill of sale has been defined as a legal document made by the seller to a purchaser, reporting that on a specific date at a specific locality and for a particular sum of money or other value received, the seller sold to the purchaser a specific item of personal property or parcel of real property of which he had lawful possession. Black's Law Dictionary on its part defines a bill of sale as "an instrument for the conveyance of title to personal property, absolutely or by way of security". According to Omotola the bill of sale is "a form of legal mortgage of chattels". Bullen and Leake and Jacobs define a bill of sale as "a document transferring a proprietary interest in personal chattels from one individual (the 'grantor') to another (the 'grantee'), without possession being delivered to the grantee".

In essence, a bill of sale is a written instrument showing the voluntary transfer of a right or interest or title to personal property, either by way of security or absolutely, from one person to another without the actual physical possession of the property leaving the owner and being delivered to the other party. It is clear from the definitions above that the bills of sale are essentially of two types: The absolute bill of sale and the conditional bill of sale.

=== The absolute bill of sale ===
Absolute bills of sale, which do not represent any form of security whatsoever, are simply documents evidencing assignments, transfers, and other assurances of personal chattels, which are substantially no more than mere contracts of sale of goods covered by the common law of contract and the sale of goods law.

=== The conditional bill of sale ===
The conditional bill of sale refers to any assignment or transfer of personal chattels to a person by way of security for the payment of money. The conditional bill of sale creates a security in favour of the grantee of the bill whereby the grantee is given personal right of seizure giving right to a security interest of a possessory nature.

There are other forms of security over goods such as a pledge and contractual lien which also only give right to a security interest of a possessory nature.

An example of a conditional bill of sale can be found where a creditor gives a loan and has transferred to himself, as collateral or security for the loan, the title of the goods or other personal property of the debtor. The physical goods or other property however remains with the debtor.

== England and Wales ==
=== Historical perspective ===
Bills of sale have existed at common law since at least the Middle Ages when they were most commonly used commercially in the shipping industry. As the general population began to own more personal goods in the Victorian era, bills of sale came to be used as a form of consumer credit. Lenders would extend credit on the security of:

all and every the household goods, furniture, plate, linen, china, books, stock in trade, brewing utensils and all the effects.

Most often, people would grant bills of sale over their goods as security for a loan. Borrowers would transfer ownership of their goods to the lender, while retaining possession of them when making repayments. When the loan was repaid, the borrower would regain ownership. Bills of sale used in this way are known as "security bills".

Sometimes, bills of sale would transfer ownership outright, such as when a person sold their goods to another while retaining possession. Bills of sale used for purposes other than borrowing money are known as "absolute bills".

=== Bills of Sale Acts ===
The increased use of bills of sale in the Victorian era created a "false wealth" problem. Potential purchasers and other lenders could be misled into thinking that the person in possession of goods still owned them. The person in possession could sell the goods or use them to secure another loan. In both cases, the transaction was fraudulent, but the purchaser or lender had no way of discovering that the goods were already subject to a bill of sale.

Bills of Sale Act 1854
- Act of Parliament
- Parliament of the United Kingdom
- Long title: An Act for preventing Frauds upon Creditors by secret Bills of Sale of personal Chattels.
- Citation: 17 & 18 Vict. c. 36
- Territorial extent: England and Wales (Note: Section 8.)

Dates
- Royal assent: 10 July 1854
- Commencement: 10 July 1854 (Note: Section 1.)
- Repealed: 1 January 1879
Other legislation
Amended by	Bills of Sale Act 1866; Statute Law Revision Act 1875
Repealed by	Bills of Sale Act 1878

Status: Repealed

Text of statute as originally enacted

Bills of Sale Act 1866 (Note: Section 2.)
- Act of Parliament
- Parliament of the United Kingdom
- Long title: An Act to amend the Bills of Sale Act, 1854.
- Citation: 29 & 30 Vict. c. 96
- Territorial extent: England and Wales (Note: Section 11.)

Dates
- Royal assent: 10 August 1866
- Commencement: 10 August 1866 (Note: The Acts of Parliament (Commencement) Act 1793.)
- Repealed: 1 January 1879
Other legislation
Amends	Bills of Sale Act 1864
Repealed by	Bills of Sale Act 1878

Status: Repealed

Text of statute as originally enacted

As a result, Parliament passed the Bills of Sale Act 1878 (41 & 42 Vict. c. 31). This largely replicated the provisions of an earlier Bills of Sale Act 1854 (17 & 18 Vict. c. 36). It requires all bills of sale to be registered at the High Court so that interested third parties could check whether the person in possession has already transferred away ownership of goods.

Bills of Sale Act (1878) Amendment Act 1882
- Act of Parliament
- Parliament of the United Kingdom
- Long title: An Act to amend the Bills of Sale Act, 1878.
- Citation: 45 & 46 Vict. c. 43
- Territorial extent: England and Wales (Note: Section 18.)

Dates
- Royal assent: 18 August 1882
- Commencement: 1 November 1882 (Note: Section 2.)
Other legislation
Amends	Bills of Sale Act 1878
Amended by	Statute Law Revision Act 1898; Administration of Justice Act 1925; Decimal Currency Act 1969; Consumer Credit Act 1974; Insolvency Act 1985; Insolvency Act 1986; Limited Liability Partnerships Regulations 2001; Tribunals, Courts and Enforcement Act 2007; Crime and Courts Act 2013

Status: Amended

Text of statute as originally enacted

Revised text of statute as amended

Text of the Bills of Sale Act (1878) Amendment Act 1882 as in force today (including any amendments) within the United Kingdom, from legislation.gov.uk.

The Bills of Sale Act (1878) Amendment Act 1882 (45 & 46 Vict. c. 43) had a different purpose. The 1878 act led to a rise in the use of security bills. Concerns were expressed that such transactions could lead "thousands of honest and respectable people to their ruin". Parliament noted that:

Many money-lenders advertised under the names of fictitious banks; and sometimes they advertised in this form – "A widow, with capital to spare, will be happy to lend on easy terms. Strict secrecy. Five per cent." ... Having entrapped a man into his office, the money-lender proceeded in this way – He produced a bill of sale containing a large number of clauses, which it was impossible for the borrower to read or understand in the time allowed ...

— John Mellor, MP for Grantham

In response, Parliament enacted the 1882 act, adding registration and understandable terms as forms of consumer protection, which land had already enjoyed for decades in many counties due to its compulsory registration of deeds of sale.

Both Acts remain in force today. Absolute bills are regulated only by the 1878 act. Security bills are regulated by both and the latter naturally dominates by law.

=== Bills of sale in the 21st century ===
In the 21st century, bills of security are overwhelmingly used in the form of so-called "logbook loans". These are security bills secured on the borrower's vehicle. Borrowers transfer ownership contingently of their car, van or motorcycle to the logbook lender as security for meeting their loan repayments. While making repayments, borrowers keep possession (continue use). Borrowers hand the logbook lender the V5C vehicle registration document or "logbook"; whilst if taken to the court for civil breach of the act (which is usually prohibitively expensive and complex), the lender would swear the transfer were purely symbolic and has no legal effect as it warns on its face, in reality they may seize the vehicle amicably, or with menaces, and in either case effect its transfer at the DVLA if any repayment instalment is missed. The bill of security is wrongly not registered as a trader's hire purchase agreement tends to be.

=== Criticism and reform of the law ===
The law of bills of sale has been criticised on a number of occasions. The Crowther report in 1971 and the Diamond report in 1986 both considered the acts, with the latter recommending repeal.

In its consultation paper, the Law Commission made a number of criticisms of the law as it stood in 2015. It proposed to replace the Bills of Sale Acts with a new Goods Mortgages Act.

In its consultation paper, the Law Commission identified five key problems with the Bills of Sale Acts:

- undue complexity;
- highly technical documentation;
- the registration regime is in need of modernisation;
- they offer little protection to borrowers;
- they offer no protection to third party purchasers.

The Law Commission proposed to replace the Bills of Sale Acts with a new Goods Mortgage Act that would address each of the criticisms identified in the consultation paper.

== See also ==
- Contract of sale
- Hire purchase
- Manufacturer's Certificate of Origin
- Receipt
