= VICS =

VICS or Vics may stand for:

- Variable Inertia Charging System, a variant of variable length intake manifold
- Vehicle Information and Communication System
- Northwich Victoria F.C., nicknamed "The Vics"

== See also ==
- VIC (disambiguation)
