= Vehicle title =

Legal form, establishing a person or business as the legal owner of a vehicle

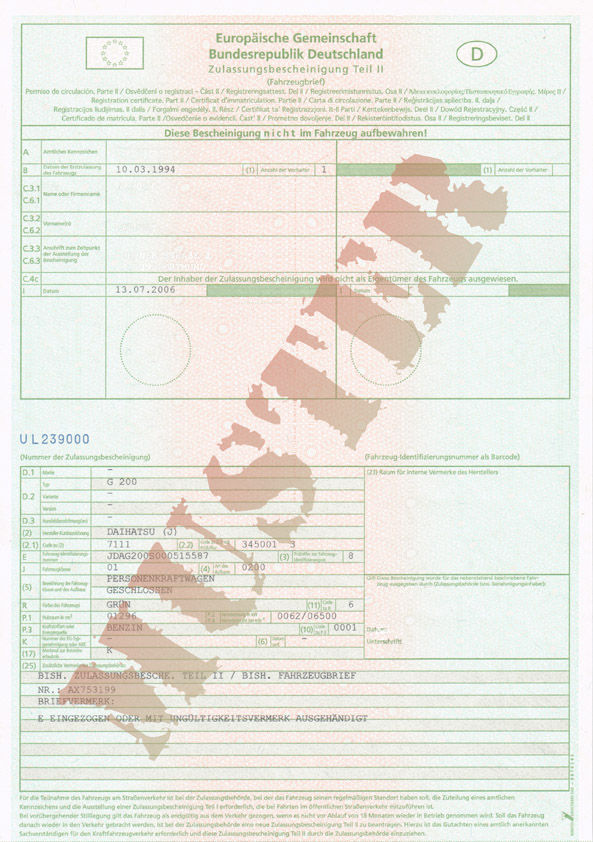
New German/European car registration document form

In the United States, the certificate of title for a vehicle (also known as a car title, automobile title, or pink slip) is a legal form, establishing a person or business as the legal owner of a vehicle. Vehicle titles in the U.S. are commonly issued by the Secretary of State in the state the vehicle was purchased by the Department of Motor Vehicles (DMV).

== United States ==
Each state in the US has its own distinct process for the Certificate of Title. When filling out the title during a vehicle transaction, the rules in one state do not always apply to a different state. For example, most states do not require a notary when filling out the title, while other states in the U.S.A. make this mandatory for most parties when buying or selling a vehicle.

Some states have different versions of the same title.

The certificate of title normally specifies (in most states & versions):

1. Identifying information about the vehicle, normally at minimum its vehicle identification number, make, and year of manufacture.
2. Manufactured color of the vehicle.
3. The license plate number.
4. Technical information about the vehicle to define its taxation regime, e.g., its gross vehicle weight, motive power, and purchase price when new.
5. The name and address of the purchaser or "registered owner" who would normally possess and use it.
6. If money is owed on the vehicle, the name of the lienholder or "legal owner" to whom this money is owed.

When a vehicle is financed, the certificate of title is normally held by the lender, who must release it to the purchaser once the balance is paid off. In some states, such as New York and Maryland, the transferred title is sent directly to that individual, but the name of the lender or lienholder appears on the title as well. In order to release the lien upon full payment, the lender sends a notarized release or other complementary document to the individual.

When a car is sold from one owner to another, the title must be transferred to the new owner. This is achieved by requesting approval by the state DMV.

When the vehicle title is lost, the owner on record may replace the lost title by completing an application with the state that issued the current title. Online lost title applications are available for several states including Maine, Wisconsin, Virginia, Michigan, New York, Indiana, Maryland, South Carolina and Massachusetts, as well as Washington, D.C.

The name "pink slip" has its origin in California certificates of ownership before 1988, which were printed on pink paper. Current California titles have broad vertical stripes of teal, yellow, and pink with a green border; while Illinois titles are blue, pink, and blue with a purple border; Pennsylvania and Nevada titles are blue with a blue border.

Many illegal street races of the 1950s, glorified in movies, featured racing for vehicle titles, hence the popularity of the term "racing for pink slips," and the 2005-08 Speed series Pinks was developed from it. In The Price Is Right, the pricing game Gas Money features contestants trying to avoid the actual retail price of the car; that price is marked with a pink slip. Also, in the 1978 film Grease, the characters mention racing for "pink slips, ownership papers".

== United Kingdom ==
In the United Kingdom, vehicle titles are not used; instead, there is a document of equivalent function known as the vehicle registration document, and it is issued by the Driver and Vehicle Licensing Agency (DVLA). The current version has the reference number V5C. Prior to computerisation, the title document was called the 'log book', and this term is sometimes still used to describe the V5C. The V5 document records who the Registered Keeper of the vehicle is; it does not establish legal ownership of the vehicle. These documents used to be blue on the front. However, they were changed to red in 2010/11 after approximately 2.2 million blank blue V5 documents were stolen, allowing thieves to clone stolen vehicles much more easily.

== Car title loans ==
Vehicle titles are also used for car title loans, in which a car owner gives the vehicle lender their vehicle title as collateral in exchange for a loan. In addition to the vehicle title, lenders often also require the borrower to provide a set of keys for the car and/or purchase a roadside service plan. Car title loans frequently involve high interest rates, a short time to repay the loan (often 30 days), and a loan amount less than the car's monetary worth. The borrower also risks losing the car to the lender if the loan is not paid back. These types of loans are marketed as small emergency loans.

== See also ==
- Title (property)
- Vehicle registration certificate
