= MV Islander (1950) =

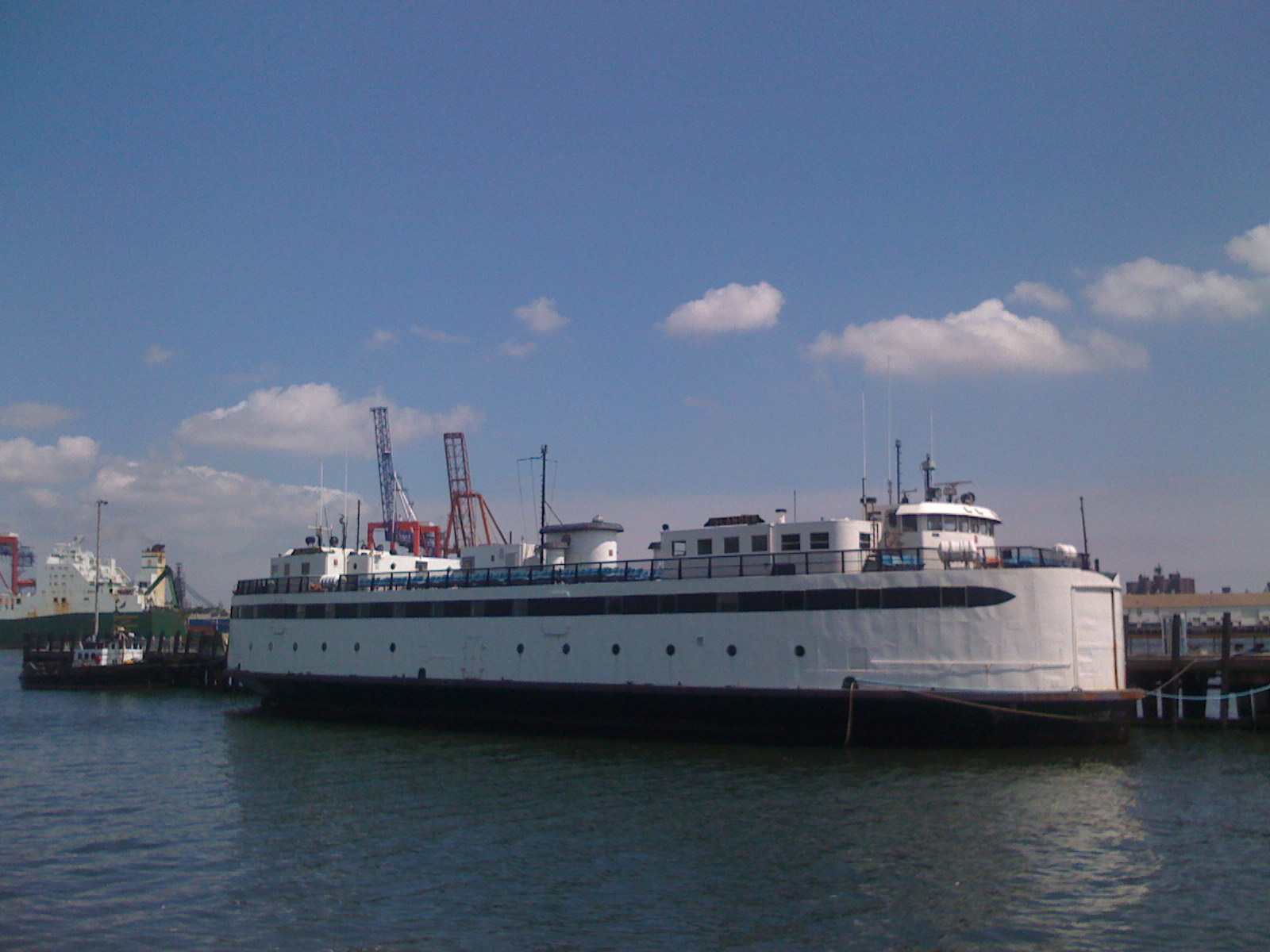
- Islander at Governor's Island, New York City, in 2009

History
- Name: Islander
- Operator: Steamship Authority
- Port of registry: United States
- Route: Vineyard Haven, Martha's Vineyard - Woods Hole
- Builder: Maryland Drydock Company
- Launched: 1950
- In service: 1950
- Out of service: 2007
- Fate: Scrapped 2012

General characteristics
- Type: Ferry
- Length: 201 ft (61 m)
- Decks: 3
- Capacity: 770 passengers

MV Islander was a 201-foot (61 m)-long ferry operated by the Massachusetts Steamship Authority (SSA). The vessel served from 1950 to 2007, primarily on the route from Woods Hole. After a brief reprieve when the State of New York tried to reuse the out-of service ferry for its route to Governors Island, the vessel was put for sale for scrap. Failing to find a buyer, the vessel was auctioned off on eBay in 2009. The buyer and the State of New York ended up in litigation, before Islander was sold again in 2010 for scrap.

== Career ==
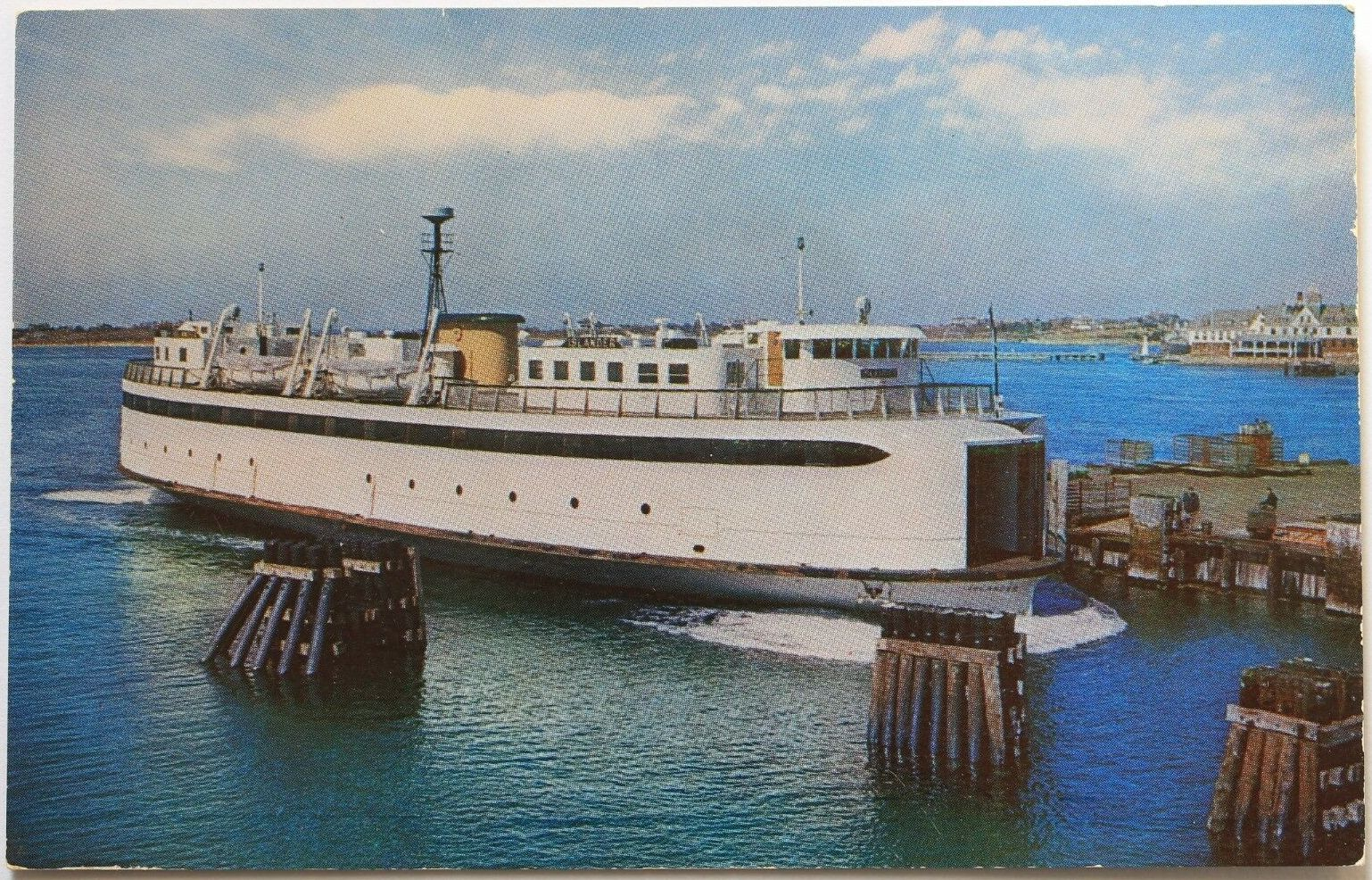
1950s postcard of Islander at Woods Hole

The ferry was built in 1950 by Maryland Drydock Company of Baltimore, Maryland. Islander was the first drive-through ferry, and the first able to transport truck-and-trailers that provided service for Woods Hole, Martha's Vineyard, and Nantucket Steamship Authority, primarily on the Martha's Vineyard run, until March 5, 2007, when it was replaced with the new MV Island Home, which was both larger and faster than Islander. Islander at its peak was able to transport over 700 passengers and 85 vehicles.

Initially expected to be sold for scrap, Islander was saved in 2007 when the State of New York made a late $500,000 bid to purchase the vessel for the Governors Island Preservation and Education Corporation (GIPEC) to provide additional ferry service between Manhattan and Governors Island.

Following a more complete survey GIPEC determined that the ferry had hull damage from running aground and significant deferred maintenance, requiring $6,000,000 in repairs to retain its United States Coast Guard passenger certification. In February 2009, unable to sell the ferry through New York state property disposal process, Islander was put up for sale on eBay and sold to a speculator and scrap merchant from Kinderhook, New York for the winning bid of $23,600. In August 2009, the scrap merchant sought breach of contract by stating the state's refusal to issue a bill of sale wrecked his chance to sell it, suffering $171,400 in lost profits. He contended that state officials wanted him to sign a "docking agreement." State officials wanted the merchant to assume full liability for, and insure the vessel before tendering a bill of sale and allowing it to be moved. In 2010, the ferry was purchased by Donjon Marine Company of New Jersey, and moved to Port Newark for eventual scrapping.
