= Registration tax =

Registration tax may refer to:

- Vehicle registration tax (Ireland) – the tax payable in Ireland to first register a motor vehicle.
- Vehicle first registration fee – the tax payable in the United Kingdom to first register a motor vehicle.
- Road tax in the United States and Australia.
