= Vic (name) =

Vic and Vik are short forms of the given names Victor and Viktor. Notable people and characters with these names include:

- Vik Adhopia, Canadian radio reporter
- Vic Aldridge (1893–1973), American Major League Baseball pitcher
- Vic Althouse (born 1937), Canadian politician
- Vik Armen, (born 1937) stage name of Canadian country music singer and songwriter Bryan Fustukian
- Vik Barn (born 1995), better known as Vikkstar123, English YouTuber and Internet personality (Vik is not short for Viktor but Vikram)
- Vic Bellamy (born 1963), American football player
- Vic Chesnutt (1964–2009), American singer-songwriter
- Vic Chou (born 1981), Taiwanese actor, singer and commercial model
- Vic Cianca (1918–2010), American police officer
- Vic Damone (1928–2018), American singer and entertainer
- Vic Dana (born 1940), American actor and singer
- Vic Davalillo (1939–2023), Venezuelan baseball player
- Vic Dhillon (born 1969), Canadian politician
- Vic Dickenson (1906–1984), African-American jazz trombonist
- Vic Duggan (1910–2007), Australian speedway racer who won the London Riders' Championship in 1947
- Vic Elford (1935–2022), English sportscar racing, rallying and Formula One driver
- Vic Fuentes (born 1983), American singer, songwriter and musician
- Vic Garra (born 1935), Australian rules football player
- Vic Godard, British singer-songwriter formerly of the punk group Subway Sect
- Vic Grimes (born 1963), American professional wrestler
- Vic Howe (1929–2015), Canadian professional ice hockey player
- Vic Janowicz (1930–1996), American college and National Football League halfback, member of the College Football Hall of Fame
- Vic Juris (1953–2019), American jazz guitarist
- Vic Kulbitski (1921–1998), American football player
- Vik Lalić (born 1976), Croatian footballer and coach
- Vic Lee (disambiguation), multiple people
- Vic Lewis (1919–2009), British jazz guitarist and bandleader
- Vic Maile (1943–1989), British record producer
- Vic Michaelis, American-Canadian comedian and actor
- Vic Mignogna (born 1962), American voice actor and musician
- Vic Mizzy (1916–2009), American composer
- Vic Morrow (1929–1982), American actor
- Vik Muniz (born 1961), Brazilian artist and photographer
- Vic Nyvall (born 1948), American football player
- Vic Perrin (1916–1989), American actor and voice artist
- Vic Peters (1955–2016), Canadian curler
- Vic Raschi (1919–1988), American baseball pitcher
- Vic Renalson ((1926–1998), Australian athlete
- Vic Reeves (born 1959), English comedian
- Vic Ross (1900–1974), American lacrosse player
- Vic Rouse (disambiguation), multiple people
- Vic Ruggiero, American musician, songwriter and producer from New York City
- Vik Sahay, Canadian film and television actor
- Vic Seixas (1923–2024), American tennis player
- Vik Sharma, British film and television composer
- Vic Shealy (born 1961), American college football coach
- Vic Snyder (born 1947), American politician from the US state of Arkansas
- Vic Sotto (born 1954), Filipino actor and comedian
- Vic Stasiuk (1929–2023), Canadian professional ice hockey left winger
- Vic Steamboat (born 1960), American former professional wrestler
- Vic Stollmeyer (1916–1999), West Indian cricketer
- Vic Tanny (1912–1985), American bodybuilder and entrepreneur
- Vic Tayback (1930–1990), American actor
- Vic Toews (born 1952), Canadian politician
- Vic Wilson (cricketer) (1921–2008), English cricketer
- Vic Wilson (racing driver) (1931–2001), British racing driver
- Vic Wunderle (born 1976), American archer

== Fictional characters and mascots ==
- Vic Mackey, an Immigration and Customs Enforcement agent in the crime drama series The Shield
- Vic Rattlehead, mascot of heavy metal band Megadeth
- Vic Romano, character (co-host) of the game show MXC
- Vic Windsor, on the ITV soap opera Emmerdale
- Lady Vic, in the DC Comics universe
- Vic the Demon, mascot of Northwestern State University
- Vic, the title character of the children's TV series Vic the Viking
- Vegas Vic, the unofficial name for the sign of the now-defunct Pioneer Club casino, in Las Vegas
- Vic, a bull villager in the video game series Animal Crossing
- Vic, the fox protagonist of the 1981 animated film The Little Fox

== See also ==
- Vik (surname)
