= New Mexico Motor Vehicle Division =

New Mexico government agency

Department overview
- Jurisdiction: State of New Mexico
- Headquarters: 1100 South St. Francis Drive; Santa Fe, New Mexico 87504-1028
- Annual budget: US$33,499,026.00
- Department executive: Alicia Ortiz, Acting Director
- Parent department: Taxation and Revenue Department
- Website: Motor Vehicle Division

The New Mexico Motor Vehicle Division (MVD) is a state-level government agency based in Santa Fe, New Mexico. The MVD operates 32 field offices across the state, along with 39 contracted offices through local municipalities. The agency is responsible for issuing driver licenses and vehicle registration. The MVD is a division of the New Mexico Taxation and Revenue Department.

== See also ==
- Department of Motor Vehicles
- New Mexico Taxation and Revenue Department
- Government of New Mexico
