= Vehicle first registration fee =

The Vehicle first registration fee is the fee charged by the Government of the United Kingdom to register a vehicle for the first time with the DVLA.

The applicable fee was £38.00 in 2006. Since 2008, the applicable fee has been £55.00.
