= Vehicle Identity Check =

The Vehicle Identity Check (VIC) was a regulation concerning car ownership that was in force in the UK between 2003 and 2015.

The VIC was introduced on 7 April 2003 and was created to prevent the illegal practice of vehicle cloning and to keep track of scrapyard vehicles. The scheme was run jointly by the Driver and Vehicle Licensing Agency (DVLA) and the Vehicle and Operator Services Agency (VOSA).

== Details ==
The VIC applied only to cars and was intended to ensure that the vehicle registration certificate (V5C) was not issued for stolen or cloned vehicles using the identity of a destroyed vehicle. When a car was written off by an insurance company as "Category C" or higher, checking was required before the V5C could be issued.

Vehicles in Category D did not require inspection. The test, carried out by VOSA, determined whether or not a car presented was the same one that was listed on DVLA records. To apply for a check, a VIC1 Form had to be completed and submitted to VOSA. A car bought with no V5C might also require a VIC even if there had been no insurance claim to confirm its identity before a new V5C was issued.

== Closure ==
Up to 2012, an estimated 900,000 vehicles had been tested under the scheme. However, only 38 "ringers" or cloned vehicles had been successfully identified.

The VIC Scheme closed on 26 October 2015. Since then, the conditions for issue of a V5C are that the vehicle has obtained an MoT Test Certificate, is roadworthy and has insurance.
