= Wiig =

Wiig is a surname of Norwegian origin (a variant of Vik), and may refer to:

- Alf Wiig (1891–1974), a Norwegian minister and bishop
- Andreas Wiig (born 1981), Norwegian professional snowboarder
- Arne Wiig (born 1964), Swedish priest, poet, author, playwright
- Aud Marit Wiig (born 1953), Norwegian diplomat
- Birgit Borgersen Wiig (1928–1998), Norwegian newspaper editor and politician
- Helge Wiig, researcher
- Kjesten Wiig, New Zealand neuroscientist
- Kristen Wiig (born 1973), American actress and comedian
- Marit Wiig (born 1949), Norwegian civil servant and organizational leader
- Martin Wiig (born 1983), Norwegian football striker
- Olaf Wiig (born 1975), New Zealand cameraman who was kidnapped by Palestinian gunmen
- Øystein Wiig, Norwegian researcher and professor
