= Bills of Sale Act 1878 =

Act of the Parliament of the United Kingdom

Bills of Sale Act 1878 (Note: Section 1.)
- Act of Parliament
- Parliament of the United Kingdom
- Long title: An Act to consolidate and amend the Law for preventing Frauds upon Creditors by secret Bills of Sale of Personal Chattels.
- Citation: 41 & 42 Vict. c. 31
- Territorial extent: England and Wales (Note: Section 24.)

Dates
- Royal assent: 22 July 1878
- Commencement: 1 January 1879 (Note: Section 2.)
Other legislation
Repeals/revokes	See § Repealed enactments
Amended by	Bills of Sale Act (1878) Amendment Act 1882; Statute Law Revision Act 1894; Perjury Act 1911; Statute Law Revision Act 1950; Constitutional Reform Act 2005; Enterprise and Regulatory Reform Act 2013 (Consequential Amendments) (Bankruptcy) and the Small Business, Enterprise and Employment Act 2015 (Consequential Amendments) Regulations 2016
Relates to	Bills of Sale Act (1878) Amendment Act 1882; Bills of Sale Act 1890; Bills of Sale Act 1891

Status: Amended

Text of statute as originally enacted

Revised text of statute as amended

Text of the Bills of Sale Act 1878 as in force today (including any amendments) within the United Kingdom, from legislation.gov.uk.

The Bills of Sale Act 1878 (41 & 42 Vict. c. 31) is an act of the Parliament of the United Kingdom that consolidated enactments related to bills of sale of personal chattels in England and Wales.

== Provisions ==
Section 8 of the act required every bill of sale to which it applied to be attested by a solicitor and registered with the High Court within seven days of its execution, and to set out the consideration for which it was given, failing which it was void as against the grantor's trustee in bankruptcy and execution creditors so far as regarded chattels remaining in the grantor's possession or apparent possession. Section 11 of the act provided that registration had to be renewed at least once every five years.

=== Repealed enactments ===
Section 23 of the act repealed 2 enactments, listed in that section.

Citation	Short title	Extent of repeal
17 & 18 Vict. c. 36	Bills of Sale Act 1854	The whole act.
29 & 30 Vict. c. 96	Bills of Sale Act 1866	The whole act.

== Subsequent developments ==
The Law Commission recommended in 2016 that the Bills of Sale Acts be repealed and replaced by a Goods Mortgages Act, and published a draft bill to that effect in 2017; the recommendation has not been implemented.
