= The Vic =

The Vic is a common short name for the following:

- The Queen Victoria, a fictional public house in the BBC soap opera Eastenders
- The Vic Theatre, a music/cinema venue in Chicago, opened in 1912 as The Victoria Theatre

The Vic may also refer to:

- Various theatre venues with Vic or Victoria in their name, see Victoria Theatre (disambiguation)

== See also ==
- Vic (disambiguation)
- Vic, Catalonia
- Victoria (disambiguation)
