= Maine Bureau of Motor Vehicles =

The Maine Bureau of Motor Vehicles (BMV) is based in Augusta, Maine's capital. Branch offices are located throughout the state. The BMV is part of the Department of the Secretary of State. They qualify and license drivers, and maintain records of driver history, as well as vehicle ownership and regulation. They also provide funding for building and maintaining the state's highways. The bureau was made in 1905 based on concern from the recently made motor vehicles.

== Locations ==
The main branch is in Augusta, however there are other branches and locations for the BMW.

For Motor Vehicle Branch Office Locations, there are locations for these communities:

- Augusta
- Bangor
- Calais
- Caribou
- Ellsworth
- Kennebunk
- Lewiston
- Portland
- Rockland
- Rumford
- Scarborough
- Springvale
- Topsham

== See also ==
- Department of Motor Vehicles
- Government of Maine
