= Vick =

Vick may refer to:

== Given name ==
- Vick Ballard (born 1990), American football player
- Vick King (born 1980), American football player

== Surname ==
- Brandon Vick, American politician in the Washington House of Representatives
- Dick Vick (1892–1980), American football player
- Edward Vick, American naval officer, businessman, and volunteer worker for veterans' causes
- Edward R. Vick (born 1958), Managing Director of Vick Foundation
- Ernie Vick, (1900–1980), American football and baseball player
- George Beauchamp Vick (1901–1975), American Baptist pastor
- Godfrey Vick (1892–1958), English lawyer and judge
- Graham Vick (1953–2021), English opera director
- Harold Vick (1936–1987), American saxophonist and flautist
- James Vick (born 1987), American mixed martial artist
- LaGerald Vick (born 1997), American basketball player
- Marcus Vick (born 1984), American football player
- Michael Vick (born 1980), American football player
- Roger Vick (born 1964), American football player
- Sammy Vick (1895–1986), American baseball player
- Steve Vick (born 1956), American politician in the Idaho Senate
- Ted Vick (born 1972), American politician in the South Carolina House of Representatives
- Walker Whiting Vick (1878-1926), aide to Woodrow Wilson

== Places ==
- Vick, Arkansas, United States
- Vick, Louisiana, United States

== Other uses ==
- Karen Vick, a character on the American comedy detective drama Psych

== See also ==
- VIC (disambiguation)
- Victor (disambiguation)
- Vicks
