= Vik (surname) =

Vik is a surname. Notable people with the surname include:

- Anne Petrea Vik (born 1933), Norwegian politician
- Arnfinn Vik (1901–1990), Norwegian politician
- Bjarte Engen Vik (born 1971), Nordic combined skier
- Bjørg Vik (1935–2018), Norwegian writer
- Frithjov Meier Vik (1902–1986), Norwegian politician
- Ingebrigt Vik (1867–1927), Norwegian sculptor
- Jakob Nilsson Vik (1882–1960), Norwegian politician
- Knut Severin Jakobsen Vik (1892–1972), Norwegian politician
- Maya Vik, Norwegian musician
- Oddmund Vik (1858–1930), Norwegian politician
- Ragnar Vik (1893–1941), Norwegian sailor
- Robin Vik (born 1980), Czech tennis player
- Solveig Vik (born 2003), Norwegian politician

== See also ==
- Vic (name)
- Wiig
