= Vic Rouse =

Victor or Vic Rouse may refer to:

- Vic Rouse (footballer, born 1897) (died 1961), English footballer with Stoke and Port Vale
- Vic Rouse (footballer, born 1936), Wales international football player and Atlanta Chiefs coach
- Vic Rouse (basketball), member of 1962–63 Loyola Ramblers men's basketball team
