= Vic Lee =

Vic Lee may refer to:

- Vic Lee, the owner of Vic Lee Racing
- Vic Lee (journalist) (born 1946), TV reporter in the San Francisco Bay Area

== See also ==
- Victor Li Tzar-kuoi (born 1964), Hong Kong-Canadian businessman
