= Voice interface card =

A voice interface card (VIC) is a hardware interface that simulates a FXS on a router or network switch. This device port is used to interface telephone voice or other audio-based FXS devices.

Typically, a VIC contains one or more RJ-11 ports, allowing connections to basic telephone service (POTS), equipment, keysets, and PBXes.
