= New Mexico Taxation and Revenue Department =

Department overview
- Type: Taxation & Revenue Services
- Jurisdiction: State of New Mexico
- Headquarters: 1100 South St. Francis Drive; Santa Fe, New Mexico 87504-1028
- Employees: 803
- Annual budget: US$90,078,526.00
- Department executive: Stephanie Schardin Clarke, Cabinet Secretary
- Child agencies: The Office of the Secretary; Administrative Services Division; The Office of Internal Oversight; Legal Services Bureau; Information Technology Division; Audit & Compliance Division; Revenue Processing Division; Motor Vehicle Division; Property Tax Division; Tax Fraud Investigations Division
- Website: http://tax.newmexico.gov/

The New Mexico Taxation and Revenue Department is the state agency responsible for collecting and distributing governmental revenue in New Mexico and administering the state's motor vehicle code.

== See also ==
- Government of New Mexico
- New Mexico Motor Vehicle Division
