= Motor vehicle registration =

Motor vehicle registration is the registration of a motor vehicle with a government authority, either compulsory or otherwise. The purpose of motor vehicle registration is to establish a link between a vehicle and an owner or user of the vehicle. While almost all motor vehicles are uniquely identified by a vehicle identification number, only registered vehicles display a vehicle registration plate and carry a vehicle registration certificate. Motor vehicle registration is different from motor vehicle licensing and roadworthiness certification.

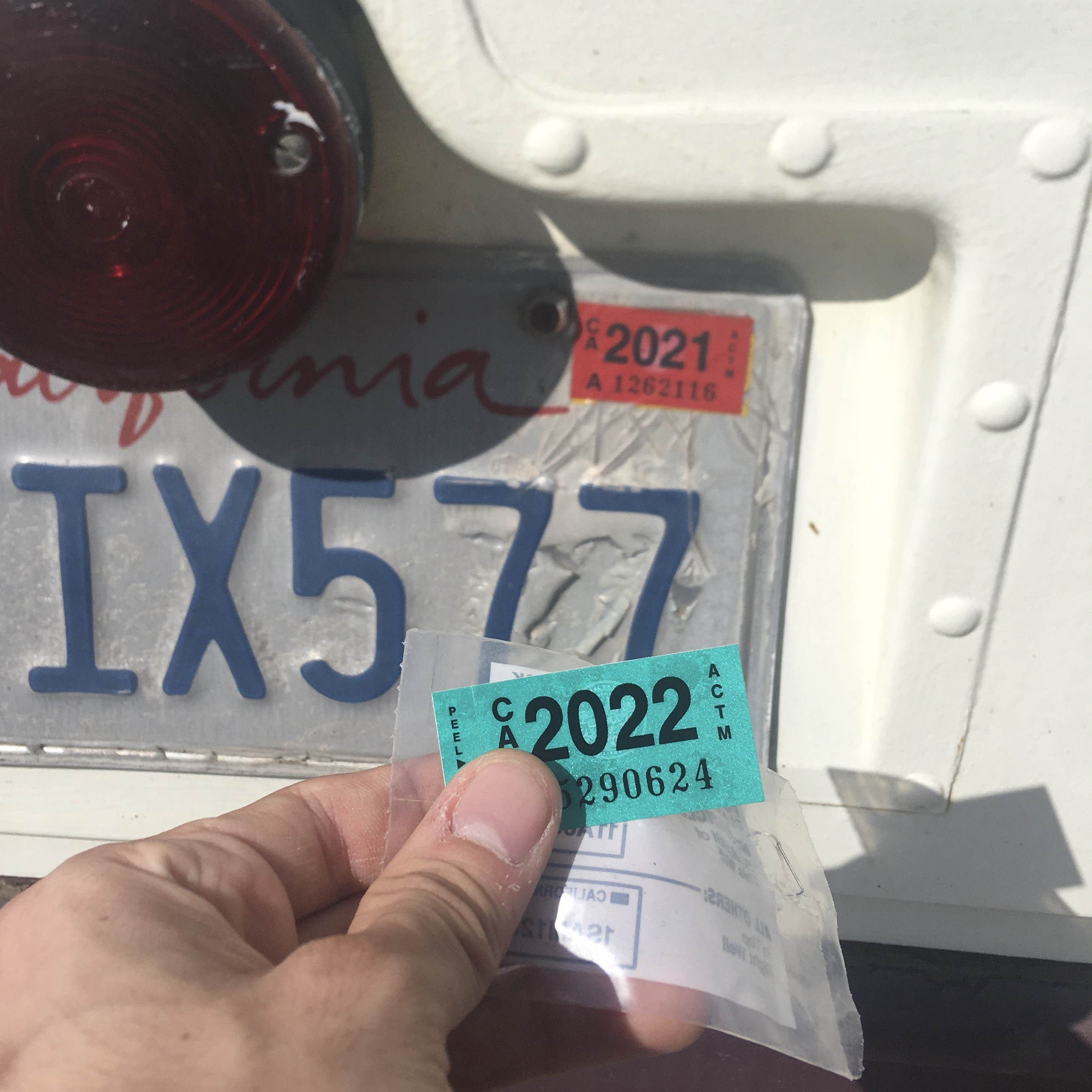
California new 2022 motor vehicle registration sticker (bottom, foreground) about to be applied to the license plate over the previous 2021 sticker (top, background)

Motor vehicles may also be registered with property owners or managers to gain benefits. For example, organisations with parking facilities may require registration of a vehicle with them to allow authorised users to park there.

== Australia ==
In Australia, all motor vehicles are required to be registered before being driven on public roads. Registration can be with one of the registration authorities set up by each state or territory. These authorities also issue registration plates (commonly known as number plates), which are affixed to the vehicle when it is first registered, and registration certificates for the vehicle. Registration must be renewed annually, with the payment of a fee. A compulsory third party insurance policy is required to renew the vehicle, as well as inspections for older or commercial vehicles. Increasingly, many registration functions can be performed online. Some vehicles are registered with the federal government, e.g. military vehicles or through the Federal Interstate Registration Scheme (FIRS) via state or territory agencies.

Registration certificates record the registered owner of a vehicle, as well as the vehicle model, make, year, shape, VIN, chassis and engine numbers, weights, engine capacity and number of passengers. Most states and territories no longer issue registration stickers for the vehicle, and registration details are available electronically to police in most states.

Vehicles can be registered to companies or individuals. The registration certificate often also acts as proof of ownership, though technically this is not the case. Ownership is governed by common law. Ownership of the vehicle (if a secured financial asset) may be checked through the Personal Property Securities Register of the federal government, though this is not a mandatory register. Often some proof of entitlement by the state or territory agency, this document can be used as a secondary identity document of the operator. Along with the certificate, the agency also issues vehicle registration number plates.

== European Union ==
Generally, privately built cars registered in any of the European Union countries must demonstrate compliance with a range of National regulations and EU directives, including, for example, that they have adequate seat-belt arrangement and a calculation of frontal/side impact resistance likely to protect passengers and pedestrians in certain types of accidents. Kit cars supplied as bare chassis without bodywork and with unguarded wheels do not meet EU safety criteria for registration.

=== Portugal ===
In Portugal vehicle registration is done by the Institute of Mobility and Transport (Portuguese: Instituto da Mobilidade e dos Transportes). The agency is responsible for issuing driver's licenses, registering vehicles, overseeing road safety, and regulating public transportation throughout the country.

== India ==
Registration of motorised road vehicles in India is done by local Regional Transport Offices of the states. Commercial vehicles registered in one state cannot enter another state without a permit, which usually incurs a significant cost. Passenger vehicles registered in one state are allowed to pass through another state, but are not allowed to stay in another state for longer than a fixed number of months unless the road-tax being paid depending on Transport Rules of the States.

A latest move by the Government of India may centralise the registration procedure in order to curb the corruption which prevails with all the regional transport offices. This is expected to make the registration of a vehicle valid in all states, unlike now, when many vehicle owners need to have separate registration certificates for each separate state, which is very hectic now.

== United Kingdom ==
Vehicle registration for England, Scotland and Wales is the responsibility of the Driver and Vehicle Licensing Agency.

=== Registration of new vehicles ===
The United Kingdom operates a four-track type approval system that can lead to a Certificate of Conformity (CoC). The first two tracks are regular schemes for production vehicles that can be registered anywhere in the EC; the other schemes, known as National Small Series Type Approval (which consists of the SVA/ESVA) and the Individual Vehicle Approval (IVA), are intended for vehicles that are to be registered in the UK.

- European Community Whole Vehicle Approval (ECWVA) is a single EC-wide Certificate of Conformity for volume manufacturers producing any number of similar vehicle types or products each year, who can then sell their wares via authorized agents in any EC country without further testing. The ECWVTA is integrated with the United Nations Economic Commission for Europe agreement of 1998 concerning the establishing of global technical regulations for wheeled vehicles, equipment and parts which can be fitted and/or be used on wheeled vehicles in diverse non-EC countries including, for instance, Russia and South Africa.
- European Union Small Series Type Approval (ECSSTA) is for manufacturers selling up to 1,000 passenger cars each year of any one type. Although ECSSTA allows sales anywhere in the EU, there may be some technical and administrative requirements in some countries to ensure to ongoing adherence to the certificate of compliance, notably where small and medium enterprises act as sales agents or may offer customization services without the clear and verifiable imposition of international training and quality control standards.
- Single Vehicle Approval (SVA) is for small vehicles such as ambulances and hearses which are often highly customized production automobiles and for vehicles manufactured to unrecognized standards which are imported to Britain from outside the EC.
- Enhanced Single Vehicle Approval (ESVA) is for small batches of special vehicles.
- Individual Vehicle Approval (IVA) is for kit cars and home-built vehicles.

Of necessity—since EC registered vehicles may circulate freely in any EC country—these are broadly similar to registration requirements and procedures in other EC countries, although some authorities may be reluctant to admit prototypes or low-volume vehicles without very stringent testing.

== United States ==
Vehicle registration in the United States is managed by each state's department of motor vehicles (DMV), which goes by different names such as the Bureau of Motor Vehicles (BMV) in Indiana and Ohio, the Motor Vehicle Administration (MVA) in Maryland, the Motor Vehicle Division (MVD) in Arizona, the Department of Licensing (DOL) in Washington, and the Registry of Motor Vehicles (RMV) in Massachusetts, etc. In some states another agency manages the same or similar functions such as the Secretary of State in Michigan or the Tennessee Department of Revenue.

Registration must be renewed annually, with the payment of a fee.

Passenger and commercial vehicles must be registered as a condition of use on a public road. Vehicles not used on public roads, such as tractors or vehicles whose use is limited to private property, are not always required to be registered.

Vehicle registration laws vary from state-to-state.

There are different types of vehicle registration including: Antique, Combo, Apportioned, Commercial, and SUB.

In most U.S. states, a liability insurance policy that meets the state's auto insurance requirements must be purchased before a vehicle may be registered through the department of motor vehicles.

=== California ===
Registration is handled by the California Department of Motor Vehicles (DMV). It is the responsibility of the automobile dealerships to register new and used vehicles sold by their dealership. Dealerships employ registration specialists to accumulate and complete the paperwork necessary to title and register the vehicle. Although many dealerships are run, technologically, by large Dealership Management System's (DMS), the vast majority of work performed at the registration desk is manual. Registration clerks, up until 2006, had to track each deal using paper calendars and logbooks, a relatively inefficient process that resulted in millions of dollars in DMV fines and penalties incurred by dealerships. Technology was introduced with the introduction of the Business Partner Automation program (BPA), which allowed participating dealerships to file registrations electronically.

The vast majority of vehicles registered in California are via third party transactions, where the vehicle is sold from one entity to another, without the use of a dealership. The registration of vehicles sold in this manner is done through local DMV branches or through the use of independent "Registration Service Providers". Anyone who has applied for or received a vehicle registration must notify DMV of a new residence within 10 days or face a typical fine of $178.

Ownership of a vehicle is evidenced by a certificate of title issued by the DMV. The certificate is known as a "pink slip" after the color of the piece of paper that was issued to owners, until a 1988 change in the document. The original "pink slip" (or a replacement issued by the DMV, if the original is lost) is needed to transfer ownership of the vehicle, like during a sale. The color pink was chosen to draw car owners' attention to it, to help prevent the document from being discarded with other non-essential paperwork. The terminology spread throughout the United States due to movies from the 1950s that glamorized the practice of engaging in illegal street races with the prize of winning ownership of the losing vehicle, called "racing for pinks".

== Pakistan ==
In Pakistan, there are three different types of vehicle registration process. The most popular is "Vehicle verification via SMS Services" launched by the Excise Department of Pakistan in Punjab and separately in the capital Islamabad in 2013.

In Sindh or KPK, new or used vehicles are verified online by the Motor Transport Information Management System (MTMIS) using sites:

- MTMIS Punjab
- MTMIS KPK
- MTMIS Islamabad
- MTMIS Sindh

There is also doorstep verification of vehicles, especially in Islamabad. The government of Pakistan launched this process of verification.

== See also ==
- Electric vehicle conversion
- Motor Car Act 1903
- Type approval
- Proof-of-parking
