= Vehicle registration certificate =

Official proof of vehicle registration

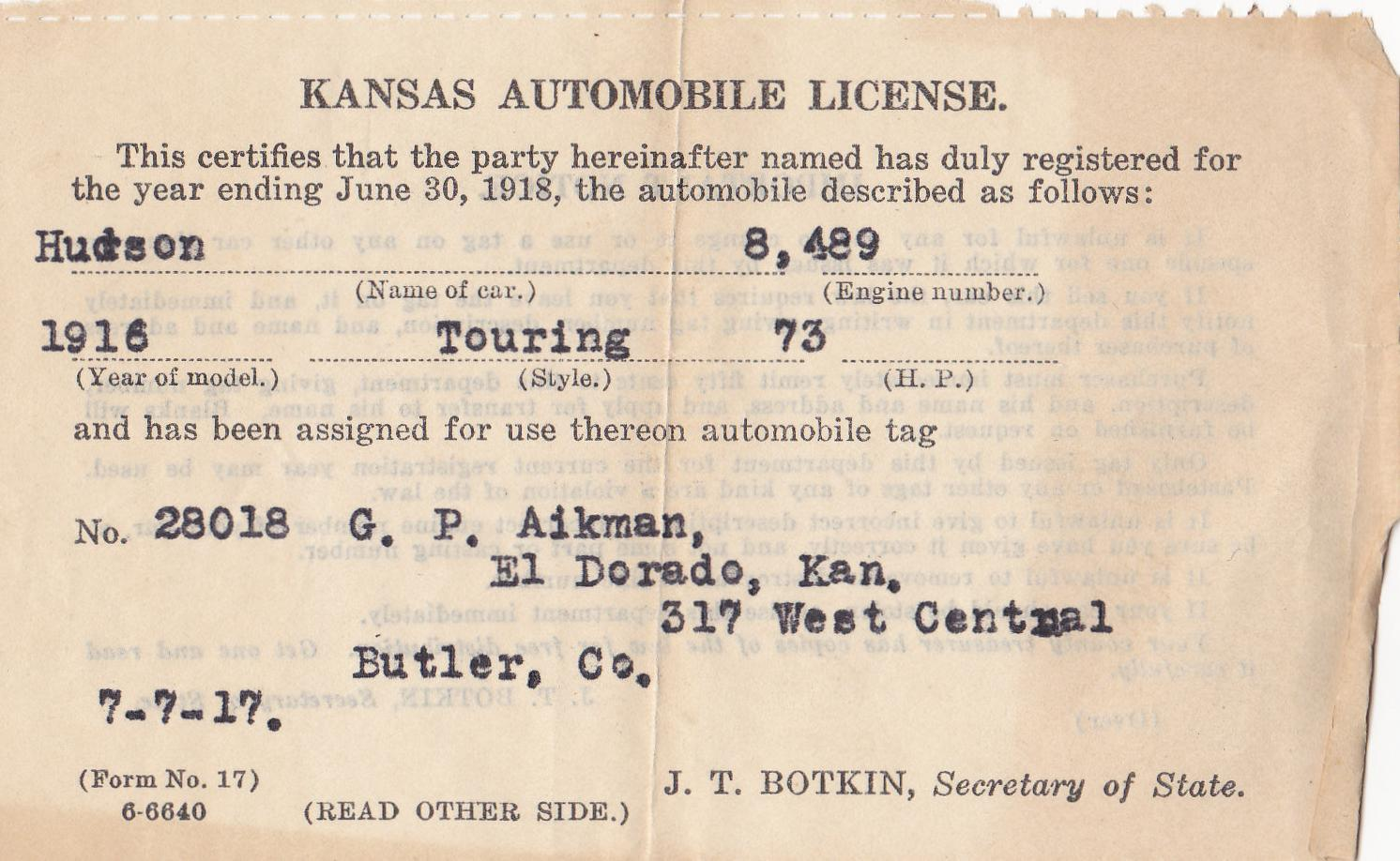
American state-issued registration certificate from 1917

A vehicle registration certificate is an official document providing proof of registration of a vehicle. It is used primarily by governments as a means of ensuring that all road vehicles are on the national vehicle register, but is also used as a form of law enforcement and to facilitate change of ownership when buying and selling a vehicle.

== European Union and European Economic Area ==
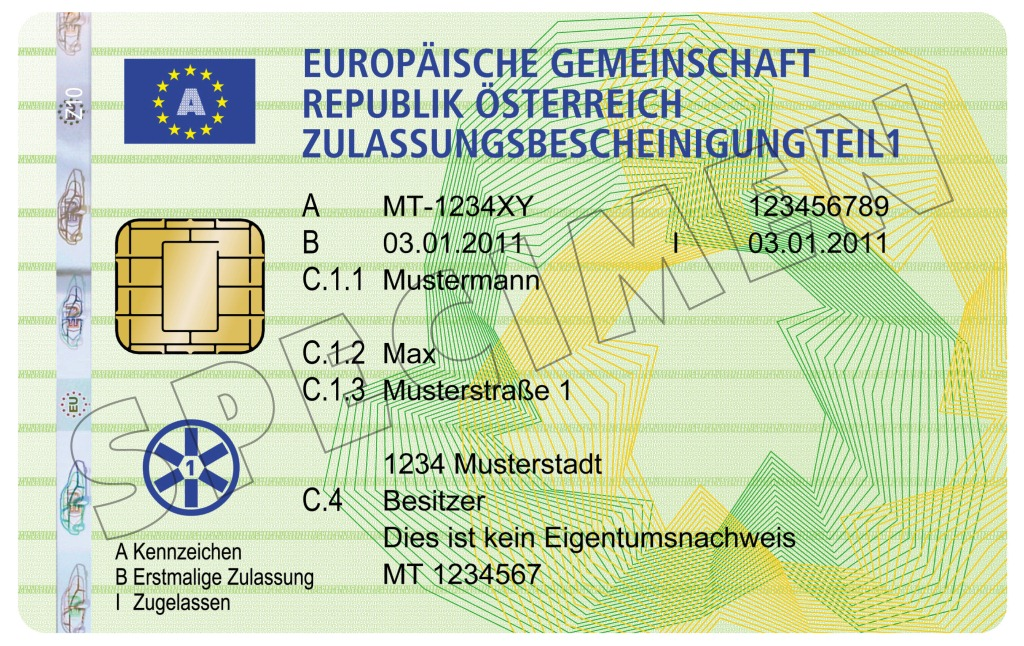
Austria - Part 1

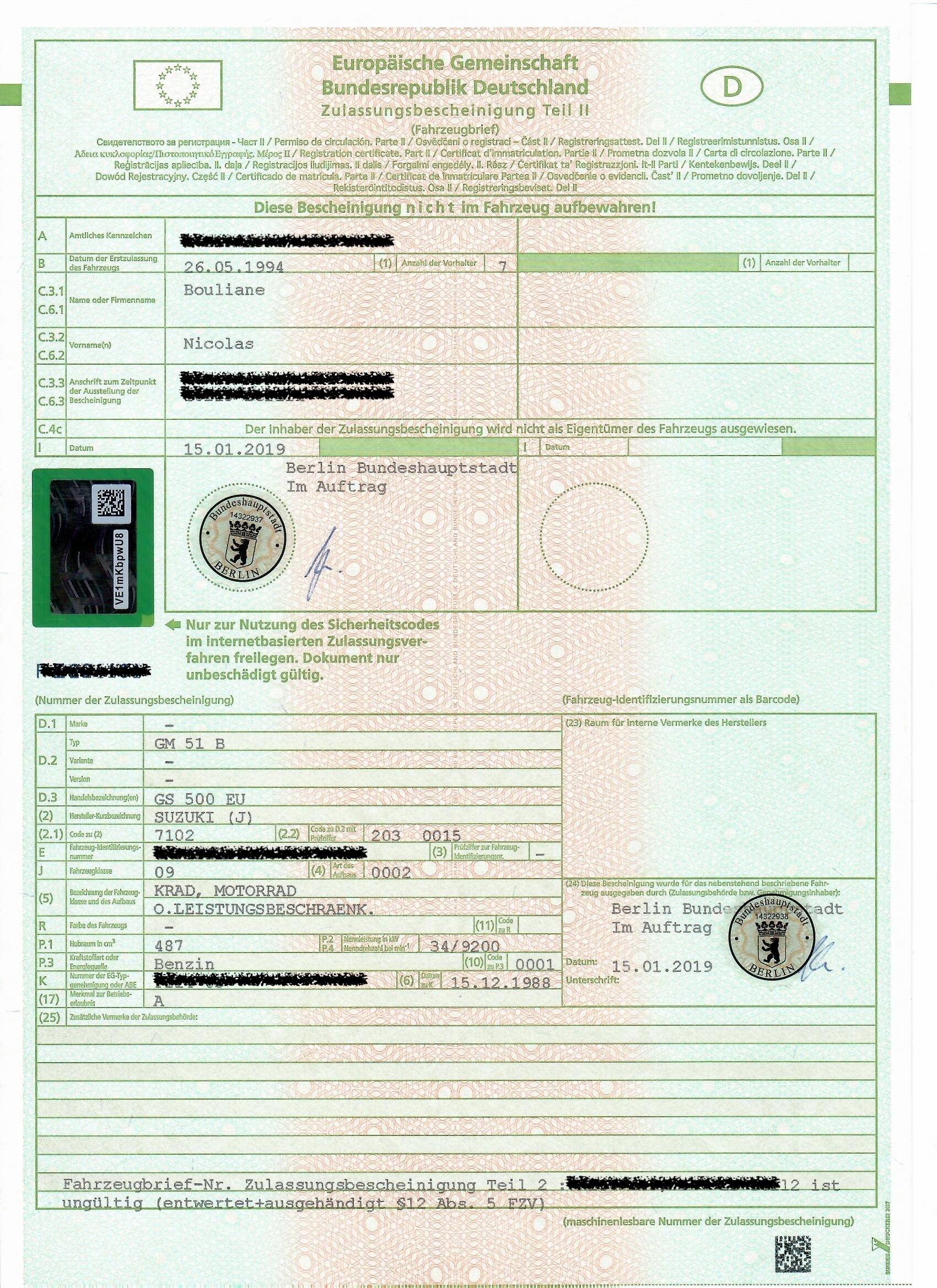
Germany - Part 2

Vehicle registration certificates issued in the EU/EEA countries may either a paper document or a smart card, as per Annex 1 and 2 of Council Directive 1999/37/EC.

In the European Economic Area (EU, Iceland, Liechtenstein and Norway), vehicle registration certificates are governed by the European directive 1999/37/EC. They consist of two parts, and can be either a paper document or a smart card. The information contained in these registration certificates includes:

- Vehicle registration number
- Personal data of the individual to whom the vehicle is registered
- Vehicle identification number (VIN)
- Engine specifications
- Exhaust emissions

== Russia ==
In Russia a vehicle registration certificate is issued by the State Automobile Inspectorate (GIBDD) when a vehicle is registered; it must be replaced whenever the vehicle changes ownership (unlike the Vehicle Title/Passport, which is passed from one owner to the next). Following the purchase of a vehicle, the owner must obtain a vehicle registration certificate within 10 days.

In accordance with Clause 2.1.1 of the Traffic Regulations, the driver of a motor vehicle is required to carry the vehicle registration certificate and present it to police officers for inspection upon request. Operating a vehicle without having the registration certificate in one's possession constitutes an administrative offense (Article 12.3 of the Code of Administrative Offenses of the Russian Federation).

The vehicle registration certificate contains the following information:

- Owner details
  - Full name
  - Address
- Vehicle details:
  - License plate number
  - Vehicle Identification Number (VIN)
  - Make and model
  - Vehicle type
  - Vehicle category (A, B, C, D, or trailer)
  - Year of manufacture
  - Chassis (frame) number
  - Body (cab, trailer) number
  - Color
  - Engine power
  - Environmental class
  - Vehicle Title/Passport number
  - Maximum authorized mass
  - Unladen (curb) weight
  - Code of the traffic police unit that issued the certificate
  - Date of issuance

The details on the vehicle registration certificate are also provided in Latin script, in accordance with the requirements of the Convention on Road Traffic—adopted at the United Nations Conference on Road Traffic in Vienna on November 8, 1968, and ratified on April 29, 1974.

== United Kingdom ==
In the UK the document is the V5C, also commonly called the "log book". The document is issued by the DVLA and tracks the registered keeper of the vehicle. When a vehicle is transferred, exported, scrapped or had major modification (new engine, chassis or factors affecting the taxation class) the form is returned to the DVLA with details of the required changes, who then issue a new document with the details amended.

== See also ==
- Vehicle title (or Pink slip)
- Electric vehicle conversion
- Vehicle registration
