= Driver and Vehicle Licensing Agency =

UK government department

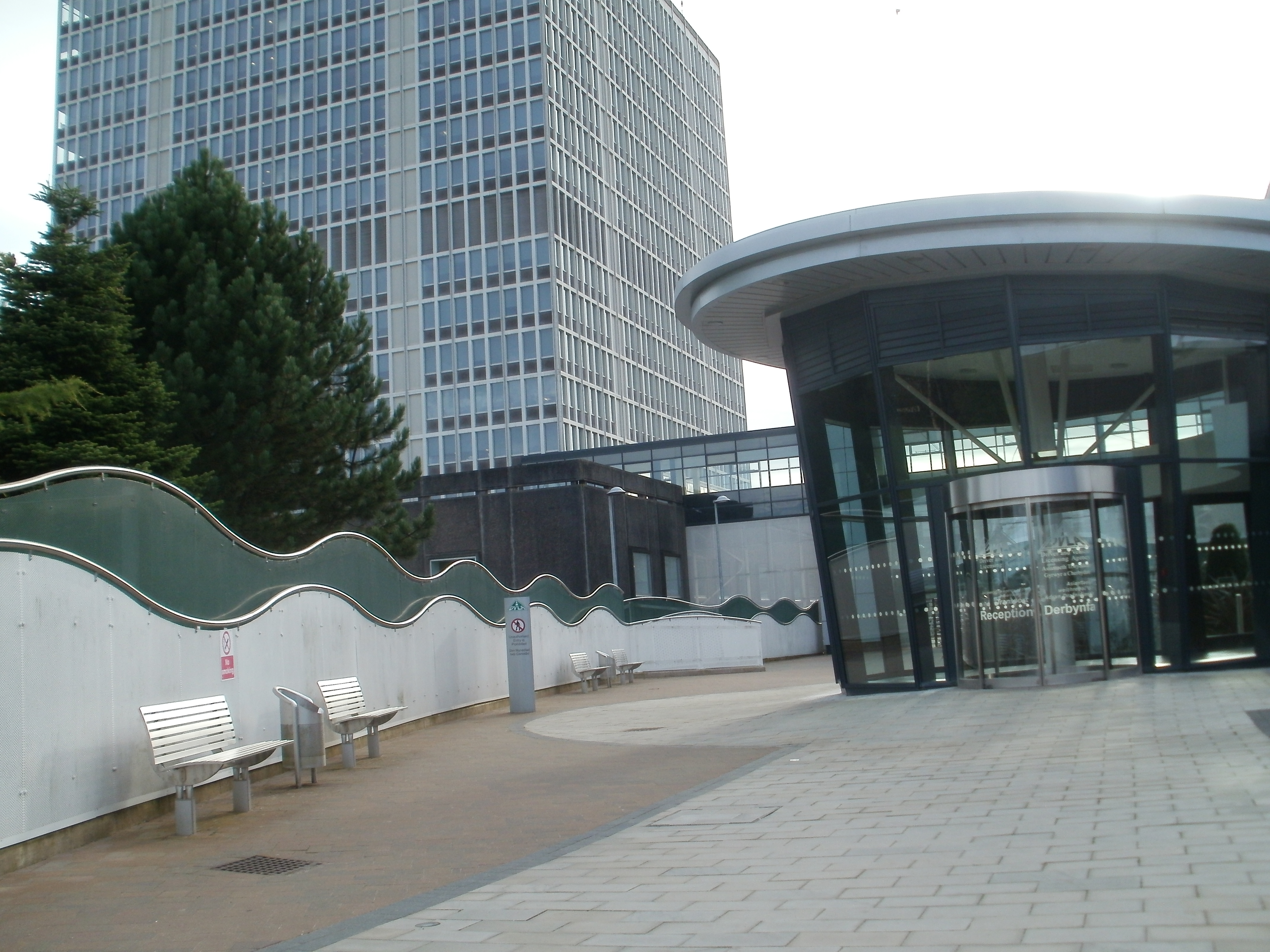
- The DVLA in Swansea

Agency overview
- Formed: 1965; 61 years ago
- Type: Executive agency
- Jurisdiction: United Kingdom
- Headquarters: Swansea, Wales
- Employees: 5,715
- Agency executive: Tim Moss, chief executive officer
- Parent agency: Department for Transport
- Website: gov.uk/dvla

The Driver and Vehicle Licensing Agency (DVLA; Welsh: Asiantaeth Trwyddedu Gyrwyr a Cherbydau) is the organisation of the British government responsible for maintaining a database of drivers in Great Britain and a database of vehicles for the entire United Kingdom. Its counterpart for drivers in Northern Ireland is the Driver and Vehicle Agency. The agency issues driving licences, organises collection of vehicle excise duty (also known as road tax and road fund licence) and sells personalised registrations.

Originally formed as a part of the Ministry of Transport in 1965, the DVLA today is an executive agency of the Department for Transport. The current chief executive of the agency is Tim Moss.

The DVLA is based in Swansea, Wales, with a prominent 16-storey building in Clase and offices in Swansea Vale. It was previously known as the Driver and Vehicle Licensing Centre. The agency previously had a network of 39 offices around Great Britain, known as the Local Office Network, where users could attend to apply for licences and transact other business, but throughout the course of 2013, the local offices were gradually closed down, and all had been closed by December 2013. The agency's work is consequently fully centralised in Swansea, with the majority of users having to transact remotely – by post or (for some transactions) by phone.

DVLA introduced Electronic Vehicle Licensing in 2004, allowing customers to pay vehicle excise duty online and by telephone. However, customers still have the option to tax their vehicles via the Post Office. A seven-year contract enabling the Post Office to continue to process car tax applications was agreed in November 2012, with the option of a three-year extension.

== History ==
Originally, vehicle registration was the responsibility of County Borough and County councils throughout Great Britain, a system created by the Motor Car Act 1903. In 1968 a centralised licensing system was set up at a new Swansea Driver and Vehicle Licensing Centre, taking over licences issued from County/Borough councils. A new purpose built centre was then built on the site of the old Clase Farm on Longview Road, Swansea in 1969.

=== Construction ===
In November 1967 it was expected to have 4,000 staff. It was previously estimated to have 2,000 staff.

- Stage 1, 2 were built by FG Minter, £2.75 million. Stage 2, was a four-storey block, £1.3 million, to be built by April 1971.
- Stage 3, built by FG Minter, £4 million

It was 25 acres (10 ha). FG Minter also built the Sport Wales National Centre at the same time.

=== Computers ===
In April 1969, a contract of around £10 million was given to ICL. No American companies could apply for the contract. It started operations on 1 March 1973. 98% of licence requests were completed within 10 days. On 1 March 1973 the new licences were first issued, with a green sheet. Previously it was a red book.

It started from day one with driver licences, but vehicle registrations took two years to appear. Vehicles registered from 1 October 1974 first appeared on the Swansea computer. From 1 April 1975, L, M and N registrations were added. From 1 November 1975, K registrations were added. From July 1976, H and J registrations were added. By July 1977, D registrations were added.

By August 1977, there were 5,300 staff. Each month around 900,000 new or amended licences were issued. There was 5,500 staff by 1978.

=== Renaming ===
In April 1990, the Licensing Centre was renamed the Driver and Vehicle Licensing Agency, becoming an executive agency of the Department for Transport.

=== British Forces Germany civilian vehicles ===
Civilian vehicles used in Germany by members of British Forces Germany or their families are registered with the DVLA on behalf of the Ministry of Defence.

=== Diplomatic and consular vehicles ===
Official diplomatic and consular vehicles are registered with the DVLA on behalf of the Foreign and Commonwealth Office.

== DVLA database ==
Pre-2012 logo of DVLA

The vehicle register held by DVLA is used in many ways. For example, by the DVLA itself to identify untaxed vehicles, and by outside agencies to identify keepers of cars entering central London who have not paid the congestion charge, or who exceed speed limits on a road that has speed cameras by matching the cars to their keepers utilising the DVLA database. The current DVLA vehicle register was built by EDS under a £5 million contract signed in 1996, with a planned implementation date in October 1998, though actual implementation was delayed by a year. It uses a client–server architecture and uses the vehicle identification number, rather than the registration plate, as the primary key to track vehicles, eliminating the possibility of having multiple registrations for a single vehicle.

The Vehicle Identity Check (VIC) was introduced to help reduce vehicle crime. It was intended to deter criminals from disguising stolen cars with the identity of written off or scrapped vehicles, however this scheme was abandoned in October 2015. Under the scheme, when an insurance company wrote off a car it would notify the DVLA. This notification would set a "VIC marker" on the vehicle record on the DVLA database. An identity check might then be required before the vehicle tax could be renewed or before any amendments could be made to the logbook.

DVLA database records are used by commercial vehicle check companies to offer a comprehensive individual car check to prospective purchasers.

However, the accuracy of the data held remains a continuing problem. Anyone can request information from the database if they purport to have just cause to need it, for a fee of £2.50.

The database of drivers, developed in the late 1980s, holds details of some 42 million driving licence holders in the UK. It is used to produce driving licences and to assist bodies such as the Driver and Vehicle Standards Agency, police and courts in the enforcement of legislation concerning driving entitlements and road safety.

The DVLA revealed in December 2012 that it had temporarily banned 294 public bodies, including local councils and police forces, for not using their access to the database correctly between 2006 and 2012. A further 38 bodies were banned permanently during the period.

Between 2002 and 2015 it is estimated the DVLA spent £500 million on information technology from IBM.

== Employment ==
Staff of the DVLA are predominantly female whereas other parts of the Department for Transport are predominantly male. Starting salaries as of 2008 were just over £12,500. In November 2007, a Public Accounts Committee report criticised the "amazingly high" levels of sick leave among staff at the DVLA, where employees took an average of three weeks per year of sick leave. The report said overall sickness leave at the Department for Transport and its seven agencies averaged 10.4 working days per full-time employee in 2005, which they calculated as costing taxpayers £24 million. While sick leave rates at the department itself and four of its agencies were below average, at the DVLA and DSA – which together employ more than 50% of all department staff – they were "significantly higher". Committee chairman Edward Leigh said it was surprising the agencies could "function adequately". In 2008 DVLA staff went on a one-day strike over pay inequality arguing they should receive similar salaries to other employees of the Department for Transport. The most recent level of sickness absence for 2012/13 was 6.7 days.

== Controversies ==
=== Date of Birth shown on licence ===
The Driver and Vehicle Licencing Bill (ref) that introduced the centralised and computerised Driving Licence replacing the local authority driving licence was met with concern due to the requirement to provide a date of birth to the Driver Vehicle Licencing Agency.

Although there were a few reasons given as objection the main ones were:

- That licence holders didn't want people who saw the licence to immediately know their age.
- That people did not see why it was necessary, because in 1973 there was no upper limit on driving age provided the driver had passed a driving test.
- The concern that the government wanted to extend the use of the driving licence to re-introduce a National Identity Card.
  - Although the post World War II Labour Attlee Government retained the National Identity Card, the recently elected Conservative government led by Winston Churchill abolished them in 1952 after public outrage that reached a pinnacle following the Willcock prosecution.

The reason given by the government for requiring the date of birth was so that drivers with the same name could be identified individually based using both name and date of birth. When the government proposed the Driver and Vehicle Licencing Bill in parliament, Neil Carmichael MP Parlimentary Secretary for the government said: “"Members have been concerned about the age being shown on the driving licence. This is a matter of the correct figuring for the computer. The age given on the licence will be coded and will not be understandable by the public." — Hansard, House of Commons, 22 November 1968”. Implying that the date of birth would be encoded.

However when the first driving licences were issued it became clear that it was simple to extract the date of birth from the unique driving licence number. The 16 character identifier introduced then and still used today always has the date of birth shown in characters 10^{th} to 16^{th}. The format was YDDMMY, e.g. a date of birth of 17^{th} October 1968 would show as 617108. There is an additional wrinkle in that females have ‘50’ added to the month. So a female with the same date of birth would show as 617608.

Although there was much comment in the news media and both houses of parliament, the government refused to change the approach.

In 1977 the government changed the regulations so that date of birth was simply stated in clear plane text in its own field. So between 1973 and 1977 the government was able to overcome public concern to the introduction of a date of birth field to the driving licence through a process of subterfuge and stubbornness.

=== Missing documents ===
In 2006, 120,000 to 130,000 vehicle registration certificates went missing. A BBC investigation in 2010 found that vehicles worth £13 million had been stolen using the documents in the 18 months preceding the investigation. Around ten cars are found each week to have forged log books and police said it would be decades before they were all recovered.

=== DVLA letter bombs ===
On 7 February 2007, a letter bomb was sent to the DVLA in Swansea and injured four people. It is suspected that this is part of a group of letter bombs sent to other organisations that deal with the administration of motoring charges and offences, such as Capita in central London, which was targeted a few days earlier. Miles Cooper, aged 27, a school caretaker, was arrested on 19 February 2007, and charged on 22 February. The DVLA have since installed X-ray machines in all post opening areas to reduce the effectiveness of any further attacks.

=== Wrong confidential records on surveys ===
In December 2007, it was revealed that while sending out surveys to 1,215 drivers, the DVLA sent out confidential details, but to the wrong owners. The error occurred during the sending out of routine surveys, and was not discovered until members of the public contacted the DVLA to notify them of the error.

=== Lost entitlements ===
In 2009 BBC's Watchdog reported that entitlements, specifically the entitlement to drive a motorcycle, were being lost from reissued driving licences. In 2005 the same programme highlighted drivers who had lost entitlements to drive heavy goods vehicles in a similar way.

=== Sale of details ===
In 2010 it was revealed the DVLA had sold drivers' details from the database to certain private parking enforcement companies run by individuals with criminal records. The DVLA sells details to companies for £2.50 per record, but it was found the agency had sold some of these to a business which had been previously fined for unfair business practices.

=== Complaints resolution ===
The DVLA handled 12,775 complaints in the year 2015/16, of which it failed to resolve 14.9% at first contact. Overall complaints for that year were down by 6.5%. The DVLA customer service excellence standard was retained. No details were provided on how this was measured. Customer satisfaction levels varied between 76% and 97% in the four categories surveyed; vehicle registration, driver licence renewal, vehicle taxation, driver medical transactions. No data was provided in respect of complaints about the SORN scheme or other fines levied.

=== Data Processing ===
On 13 June 2022, the Information Commissioner published an Opinion in which he stated the DVLA had been releasing the details of vehicle keepers to parking companies under the wrong ground. The DVLA had been releasing these under Article 6(1)(c) UK GDPR (legal duty) but the ICO advised the DVLA should have relied on Article 6(1)(e) (public task). The significance of this is that, unlike Article 6(1)(c), Article 6(1)(e) includes a right to object to this processing, as set out in Article 21. However, the Information Commissioner also stated the DVLA can refuse objections under Article 21 because they are processing the information "for the establishment, exercise or defence of legal claims".

The Information Commissioner's Office's website states: "retrospectively switching lawful basis is likely to be inherently unfair to the individual and lead to breaches of accountability and transparency requirements".

=== Unacceptable Levels of Service ===
On 17 March 2023, a report by the Public Accounts Committee was published which was critical of the DVLA. Three million paper applications for driving licences involving fitness to drive resulted in long delays. This resulted in some people losing their jobs; others lost income and became isolated and depressed. This was made worse by difficulties making contact with the DVLA. The committee found that between April 2020 and March 2022 around 60 million calls about driving licences went unanswered, 94% of the total the DVLA receive.

== In popular culture ==
The DVLC in Swansea is regularly referred to in the BBC political sitcom Yes Minister, usually as a remote and unfavourable location. Bernard Woolley is regularly threatened with reassignment there. In the episode "Big Brother", Jim Hacker is scheduled to give an address there.

== See also ==
- Driver and Vehicle Standards Agency
- Driver and Vehicle Agency
