= J30 Protests =

2011 protest in the United Kingdom

The J30 Protests were a one-day strike held in the United Kingdom on 30 June 2011. The strike was held by public sector workers in an effort to protest the government's planned unconventional changes to pension plans and retirement policies, including raising the retirement age from 60 to 66 and the replacing of final salary pension schemes with a career-average system. The Driving Standards Agency had recently announced that it was to launch a localised trial to determine whether delivering examiners from non-established test centres could help with growing pupil demand, starting in Warrington, Wiltshire, Ayrshire, Wales and Dumbarton.

In the one-day strike, pickets and a series of anti-cuts rallies by the National Union of Teachers (NUT), Association of Teachers and Lecturers (ATL), University and College Union (UCU) and the Public and Commercial Services Union (PCS) went ahead largely as planned. Over 11,000 schools in England were affected by the strike, according to the data released by the Department for Education (DfE). Nearly 400 schools were closed in greater Birmingham and the Black Country, with another 70 partially shut. According to union reports, across the rest of England, 3,200 schools were shut and 2,200 were partially closed, out of about 22,000 state-funded schools. Only 18 out of 750 Jobcentre Plus offices in the country were closed due to the lack of strike activity by their staff, while 90% of the civilian call centre staff at the Metropolitan Police did strike. The Coastguard also reported some minor walkouts. According to the Department for Transport, some 76 per cent of driving examiners went to work. Approximately 180 prison office staff and workshop instructors mounted a picket line outside HMP Gartree Prison near the town of Market Harborough. The event was officially called the "J30" after the date on which it was held.

== Greater London ==
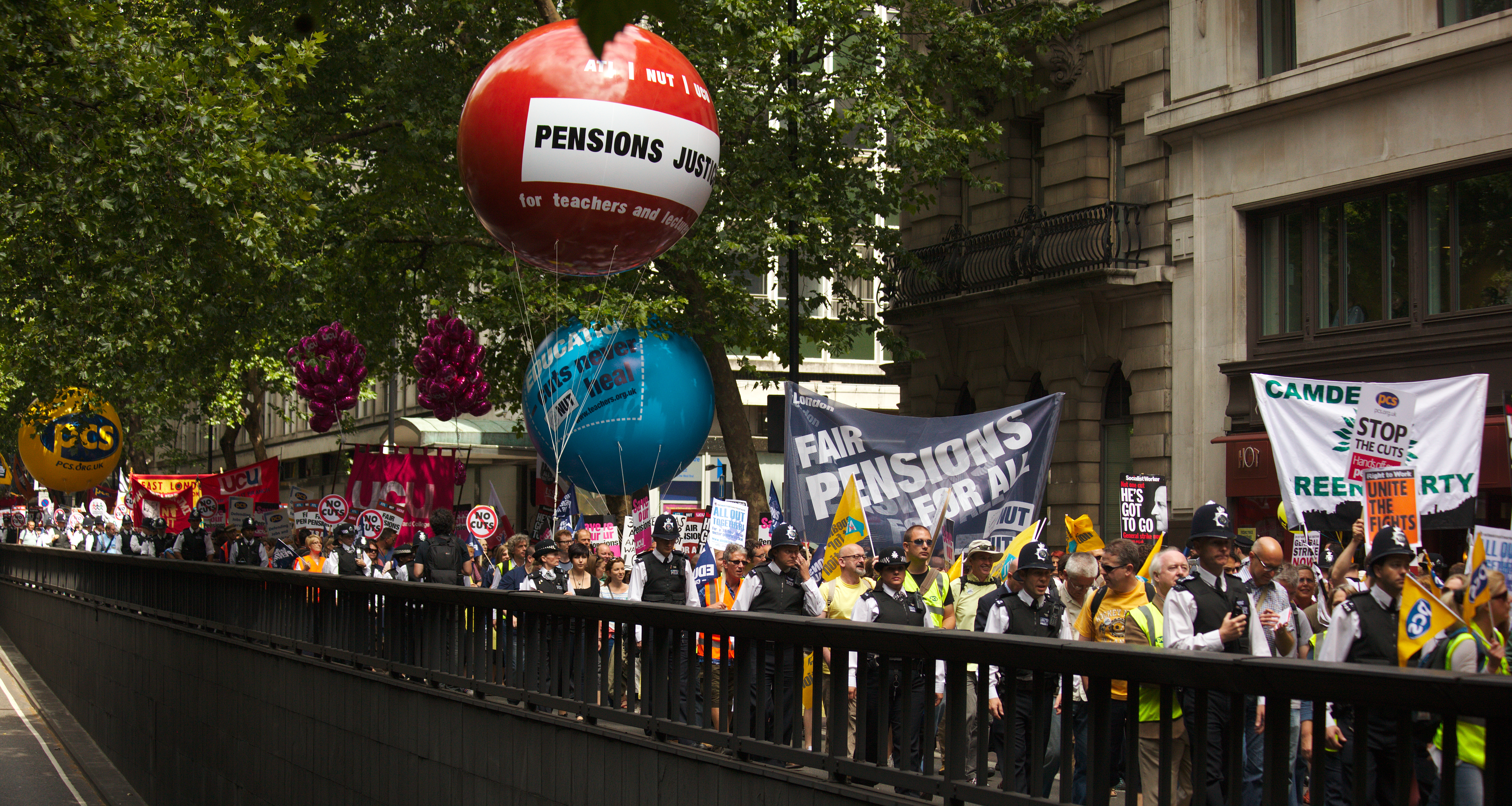
Striking teachers and public sector workers march down the Kingsway, London, flanked by police on 30 June 2011.

The main march and Trades Union events were in central London on the 30th and attracted 15,000 to 20,000 people to their cause. At one point public service employees marched past Big Ben and the Palace of Westminster during their rally. There were marches and picket lines across London including at the Old Bailey. Camden Town and Marylebone saw a few Camden Council employees hold a local strike and picket over the council's employment terms. There were queues at Border Control in Heathrow Airport's Terminal Five as some of the immigration and customs staff joined the strike. Pickets targeted the head office of the department for Communities and Local Government in central London and stopped around 20 people from crossing one of the picket lines at Eland House.

There were 35 arrests in central London and 2 in outer London. Arrests were made in Whitehall as police and protesters clashed.

== South East England ==
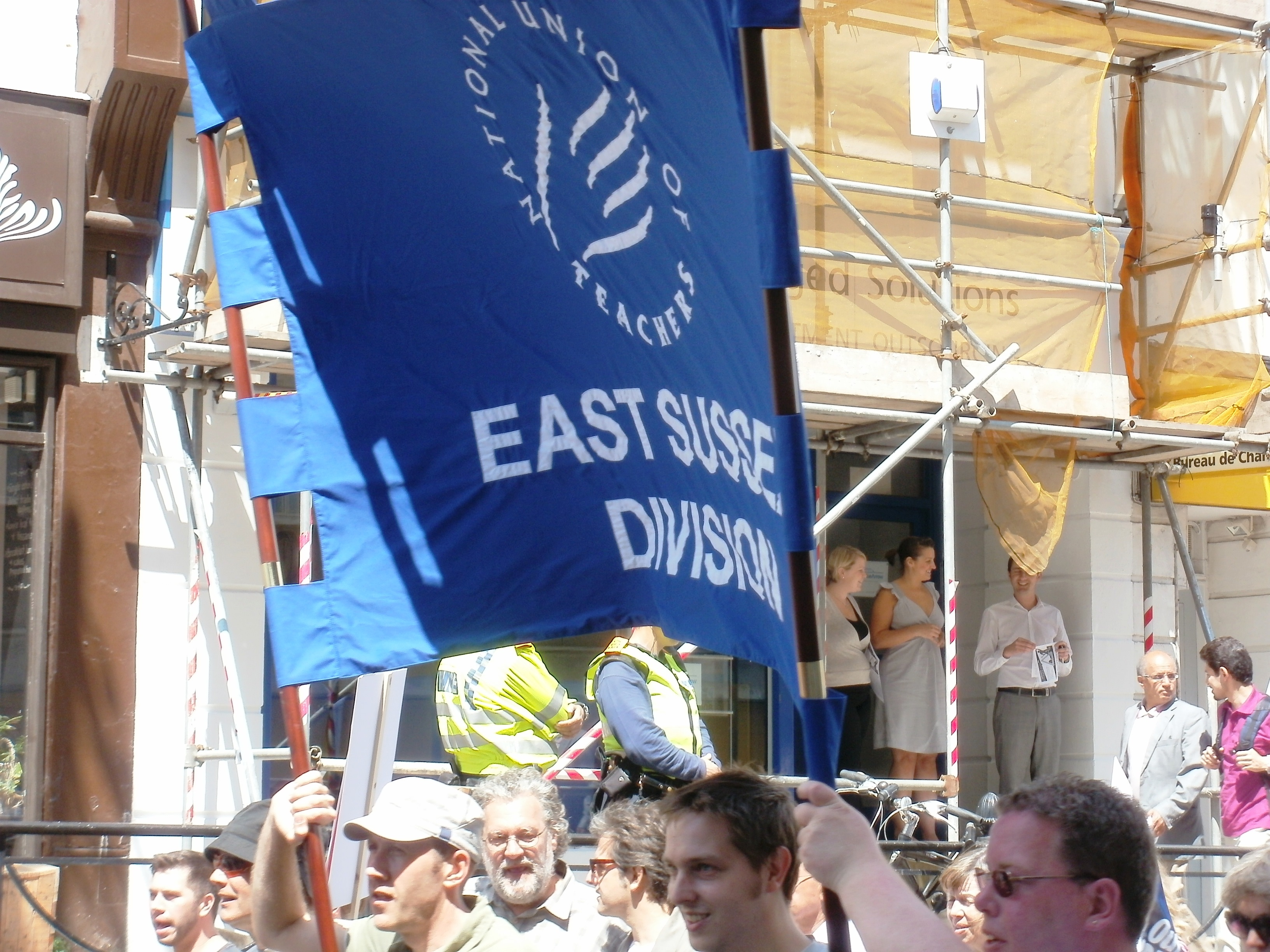
30 June protestors in Brighton from the National Union of Teachers (NUT).

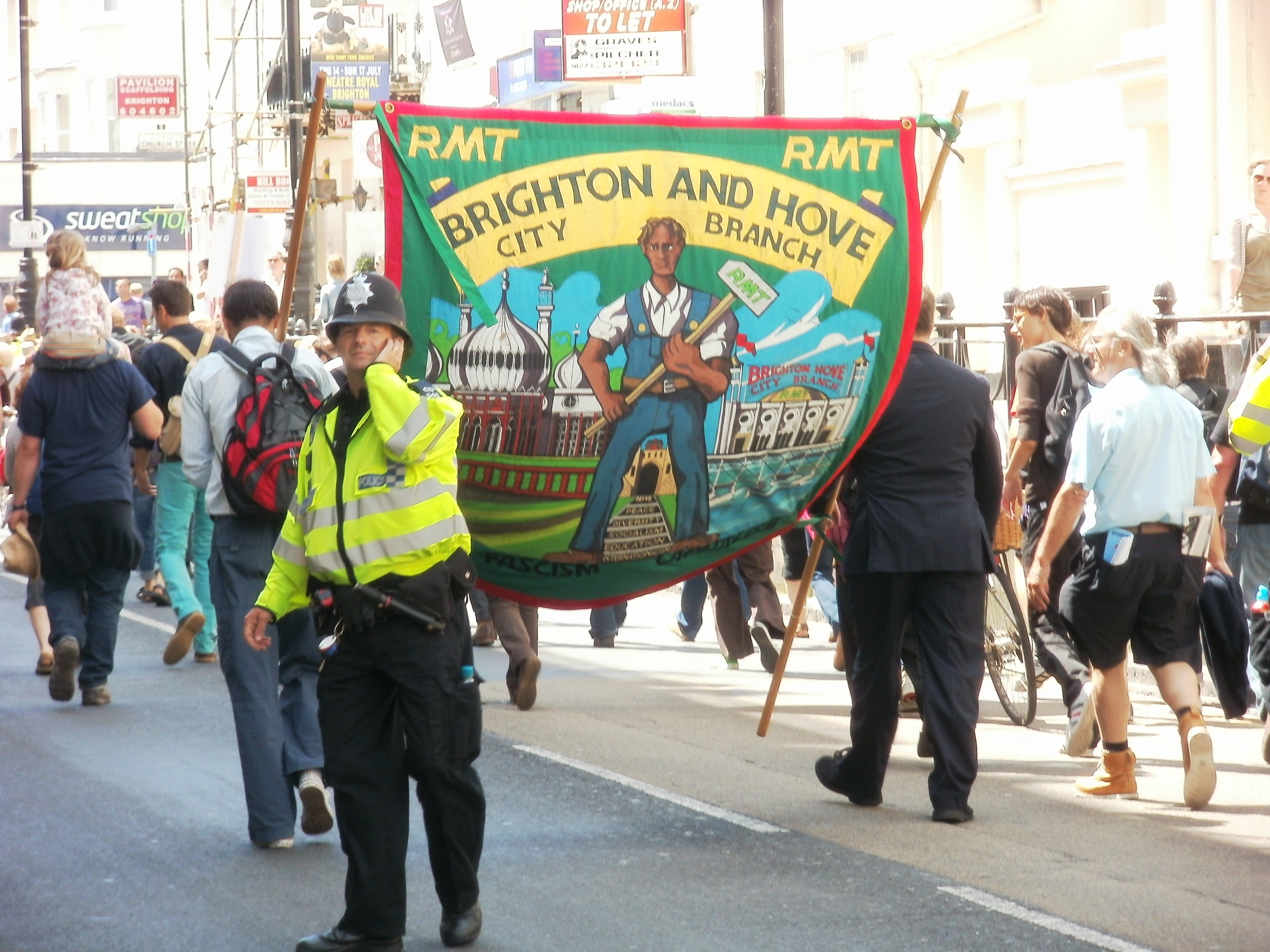
30 June pensions trike marchers in Brighton from the RMT.

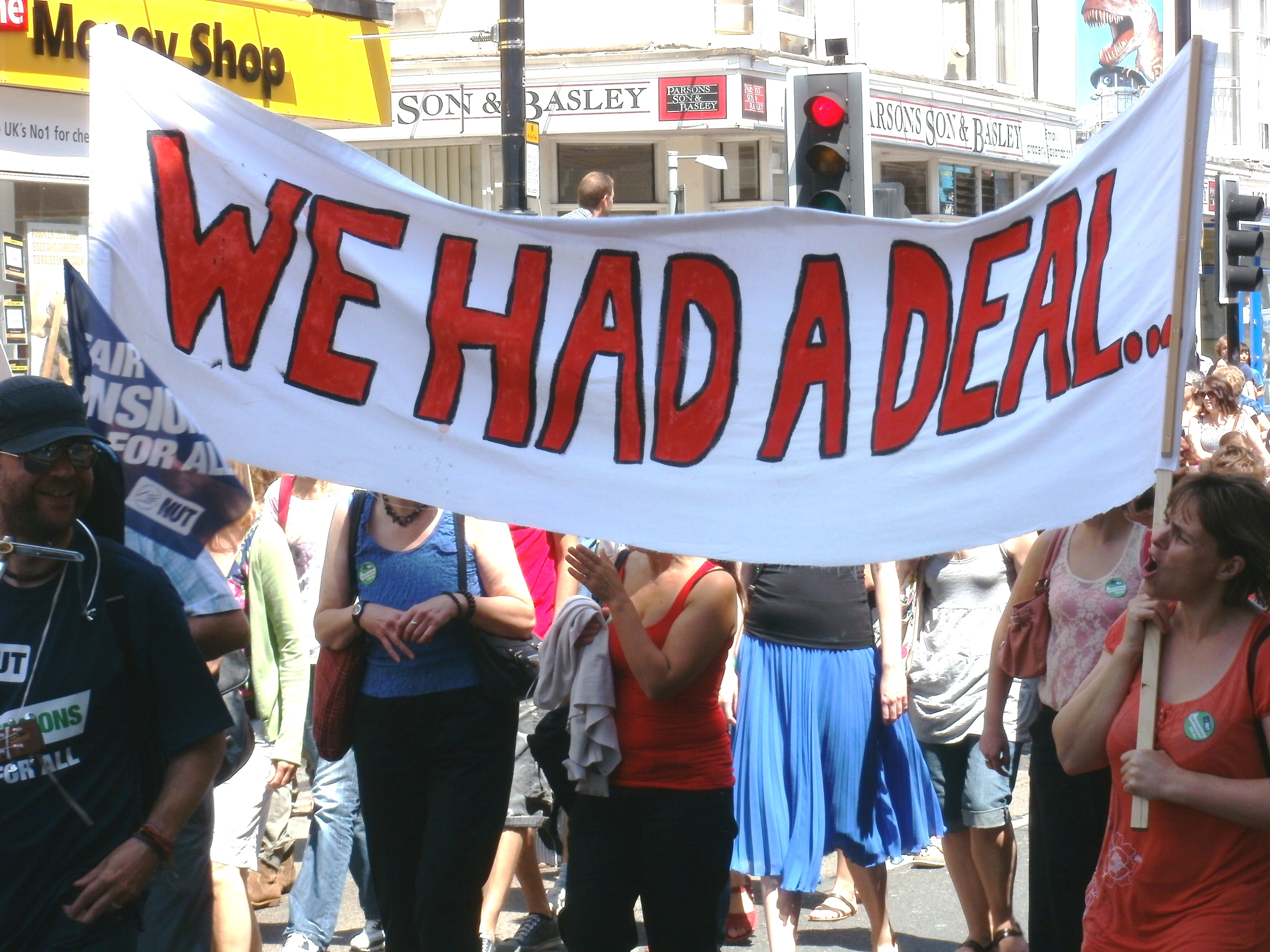
Protestors in Brighton on 30 June over pension changes.

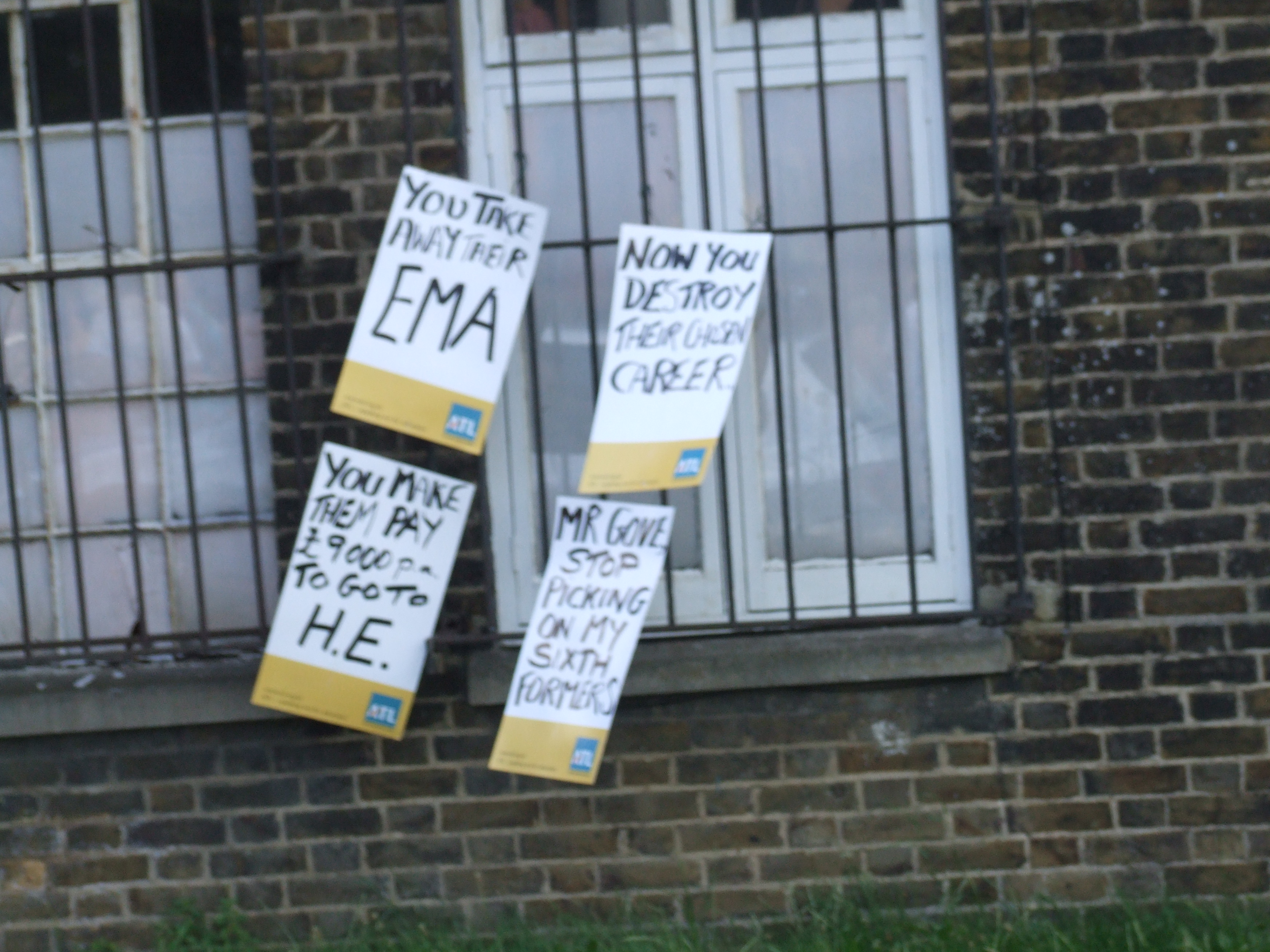
Nine rallies were held in Kent, this was the one at the Command House in Chatham. ATL posters despairing at the way, sixth formers have lost their EMA, free education and careers. Government minister Michael Gove was seen as picking on sixth formers.

A toal of 59 schools across Buckinghamshire were either disrupted or closed due to strikes that day in a protest over the Government pension reform plans. 42% per cent of the Bucks Free Press readers had to stay at home to look after their children as a result of the action, according to a Bucks Free Press online poll that day. Most schools were either closed or disrupted in Slough, Berkshire.

145 schools were closed in Hertfordshire, 61 school closured in Buckinghamshire and a further 27 were closed in Milton Keynes according to the County Councils. 30 schools had closed in Bedford Borough and Central Bedfordshire, while 23 were closed in Luton Borough the local Councils said. Most schools in Royston, Hertfordshire were shut. The majority of the county's state schools and several independent schools had been hit by industrial action, which including 12 in and around the town of Royston.

Over 150 teachers and lecturers rallied outside the Civic Theatre, in Horne Lane, in Bedford against proposed Government to change pensions. 20 schools were closed, but the Jobcentre plus, remained open despite joining the strike and rally.

The UK Border Agency has put contingency plans in place at passport control Luton Airport after members of the Public and Commercial Services Union (PCS) struck. Overseas passengers using Luton Airport were warned to expect delays on arrival. Striking workers also attended a rally in Luton.

Steve Coghlan, who is a teacher from Luton said: "I work in the public sector and I think we teachers, nurses, dinner ladies, lollipop ladies and people like that were not the cause of the crisis but the government want to punish us and rip us off." and then went on to say "The government, a cabinet full of millionaires, are quite happy to slash our pensions. They don't need to live on a pension when they're older. We do, we are normal working class people." .

The, Conservative MP for North East Hertfordshire, Oliver Heald, who sits on the government's' Work and Pensions Select Committee, told the local media that he thought the Coalition was still open to negotiating with the union on all issues.

3,500 people took part in a Brighton rally.

Teachers were on strike in most schools across Oxfordshire and several were shut as a result of it.

Over 300 schools were closed across Essex as National Union of Teachers and the Public and Commercial Services Union went on strike and rallied through Chelmsford town centre, led by Jerry Glazier of the Essex NUT.

The Public and Commercial Services Union had warned that Dover's port was going to be one of the worst affected ports in the country, but the Port of Dover authorities said operations were running as normal. The Eurostar company said their trains were not affected by industrial action and planned to run two extra trains that day. The Port of Dover authorities also said their trains were not affected either. Demonstrations were also held in Chatham, Dover, Aylesford, Maidstone and Sittingbourne.

Protester Simon Marchant, who worked at Canterbury College, said "Whatever way you look at it, we are being asked to pay more now to receive less later." and the Conservative MP for Canterbury Julian Brazier called the present unfair to "all those struggling people in the private sector".

A total of 134 of Surrey's 423 schools were either closed or disrupted, due to the National Union of Teachers and the Association of Teachers and Lecturers going on strike. PCS Union members gathered outside Camberley railway station and the Camberley Theatre for a rally that afternoon.

== South West England ==
Over 1,000 protesters spent hours slowly walking over the streets of Bristol and assembled at the city's College Green at 11.00 am shouting slogans and banging portable drums. Job centres, tax offices and benefit offices were on strike in Torquay, Exeter, and Plymouth. Other small rallies and marches also occurred in these towns. Truro had about 350 people march through the town to a trades union rally. Picket lines formed at the St Austell and Redruth HM Revenue and Customs buildings, Helston Community College, and at Cornwall College's Camborne and St Austell campuses, and Truro College. The Liberal Democrat MP for Newquay and St Austell, Steven Gilbert, accused the unions of betraying on-going negotiations with the government.

== The West Midlands ==
In Birmingham, 220 city schools closed and care workers, street cleaners, job centre staff, court staff and a general rafting of other public workers joined the one-day strike, which was called by members of the National Union of Teachers, Association of Teachers and Lecturers, University and College Union and Public and Commercial Services union and UNISON. 51 schools saw partial strike action, with at least 600 disrupted or shut across the West Midlands. A total of 5,000 striking public sector workers gathered for rally in Birmingham city centre making it the third biggest outside London. Around 72,500 of the collective unions' members in the Midlands voted in favour of strike action and Birmingham City Council's workers also joined the strike over a new employment contract issued by Birmingham City Council. This was one of the few major rallies outside London.

The UNISON union warned of further strike action in Birmingham. Birmingham City Council workers struck in support of their fellow public sector employees and to highlight their own dispute with the council and the Highways Agency's staff also protested outside The Cube in Birmingham. About 45% of schools were closed or disrupted by a teachers' strike which hit Birmingham, Northfield, Four Oaks, Bornville, Adderly Park, Erdington, Sutton Coldfield and Stechford.

Many schools were disrupted and some closed by a teachers' strike in Walsall, Brownhills, Sandwell, Dudley, Kingswinford, Stourbridge and Sedgley. Some schools were disrupted and some closed by a teachers' strike in Solihull and Dorridge. A pro-pensions protesters gathered outside the Frederick Bird Primary School in Coventry. Worcester witnessed a 1-day strike by the NUT, ATL, UCU and PCS that went ahead as planned yesterday. A picket line was formed outside the Worcester College of Technology as local tax office and Defra staff were protesting. Another picket line formed at Worcester Magistrates Court. The main county rally was at St Peter's Baptist Church in Worcester. Only a few schools across Warwickshire were open while over 100 were closed due to striking teaching staff. The Conservatives's Warwick and Leamington MP Chris White condemned the strike. A few schools were disrupted or shut by a teachers strike across Staffordshire.

Some of East Midlands Airport's immigration staff joined the protests. The teachers' unions staged protests in Rugby, Nuneaton, Leamington Spa and Stratford-upon-Avon railway station, before joining the growing public sector rally and march in Birmingham city centre. The Warwickshire protests were led by Jane Nellist, the joint secretary of the Coventry Association of the NUT.

== The East Midlands ==
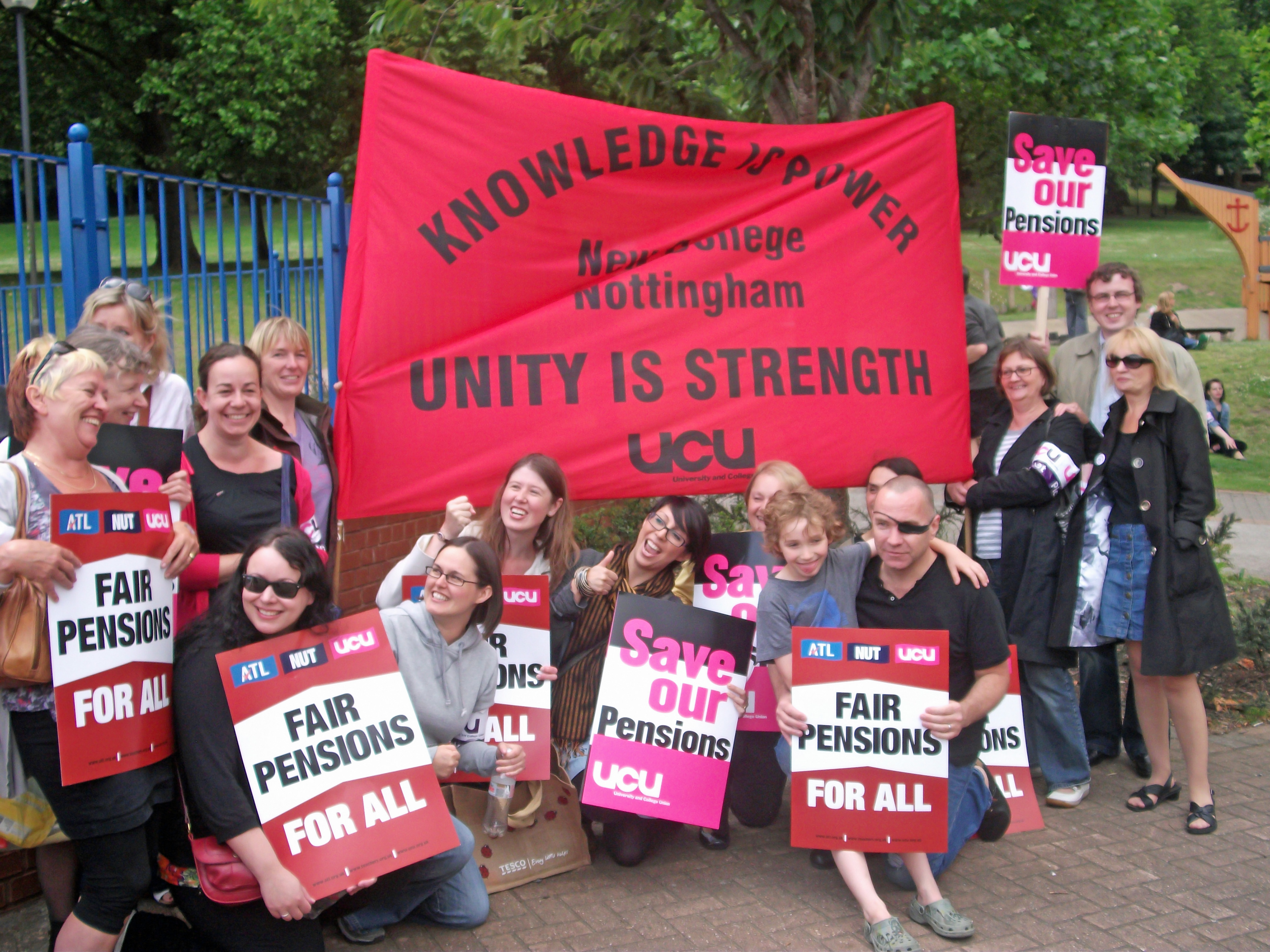
Teachers at New College Nottingham protesting against government pension plans.

Nottingham had trades unionists rally into the town centre to see members chanting slogans from a makeshift stage in the city's main square.

NUT officials handed out leaflet's backing the national strike in parts of Derby and held a small rally in the city center later that day.

Seven out of the 25 schools in Rutland were disrupted by the teacher's strike.

Almost 200 schools were shut in Leicestershire as a whole, with Leicestershire having more than 120 out of 286 schools closed or disrupted and 90 of the authority's 108 schools affected, but not closed in Leicester city. Strikers and their supporters also gathered at the city council offices in Leicester. Members of the PCS were also manning picket lines outside Regent College, schools, colleges, job centres, courts, the tax office, at Saxon House, in Causeway Lane, and HM Revenue and Customs offices, at City Gate House, St Margaret's Way, and Attenborough House, in Charles Street, Leicester. Approximately 180 prison office staff and workshop instructors mounted a picket line outside HMP Gartree Prison near the town of Market Harborough. The NUT's representative at Leicester's Wyggeston and Queen Elizabeth College, Ann Blair, said she was "disappointed that more teaching unions were not involved in today's action." .

== East Anglia ==
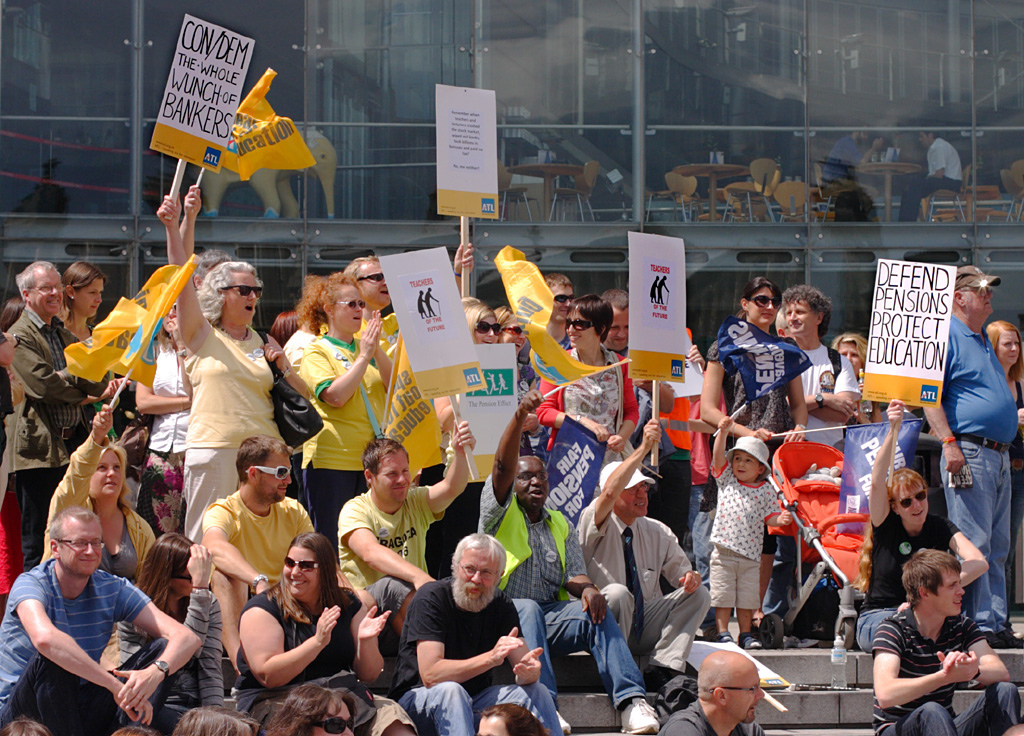
A joint NUT, ATL, UCU, PCS strike rally took place outside The Forum in Norwich against cuts in their pension conditions.

A joint NUT, ATL, UCU, PCS strike rally took place outside The Forum in Norwich against "draconian" government cuts in their pension conditions. Norwich International Airport's passport control workers mostly planned to ignore the strike not expecting strikes on the 30th.

Peterborough Trades Union Council claimed 1,000 people joined the local strike and rally in Peterborough city, which was one of the largest the city has ever seen. The protests were over the Government's proposals to alter their pensions. The unions involved included the UNISON, National Union of Teachers and the Public and Commercial Services Union.

Between 400 and 600 members of the National Union of Teachers (NUT), Association of Teachers and Lecturers (ATL), University and College Union (UCU) and the Public and Commercial Services Union (PCS) held a protest rally in Cambridge. A total of 8 South Cambridgeshire district schools near the Hertfordshire border were closed.

== Northern England ==
About 6,000 campaigners rallied in Newcastle upon Tyne, making it the second biggest outside London.

Liverpool's passport office was on strike as 537 of the 550 staff the city's passport office and the civil servants at Ministry of Defence and Criminal Records Bureau offices also walked out. Both Liverpool's World Museum and the Walker Art Gallery also had to close for the day.

Preston saw addresses from union spokesmen as 400 public sector workers and teachers who gathered at Preston's Flag Market in a show of force against Government pension reforms yesterday. The members of the Association of Teachers and Lecturers, University and College Union and the Public and Commercial Services Union turned out in force at the rally, which started at noon.

A joint National Union of Teachers, PCS and Green Party organised strike, picketing and rally took place in Salford, Greater Manchester. Both primary and secondary schools closed and there are picket lines at the Salford Tax Office, HMRC (Trinity Bridge House, 2 Dearmans Place, M3 5BG) and Salford County Court. The 11 am protest march from All Saints on Oxford Road was to the Castlefield Arena where there was a 12:30 many union speakers in attendance.

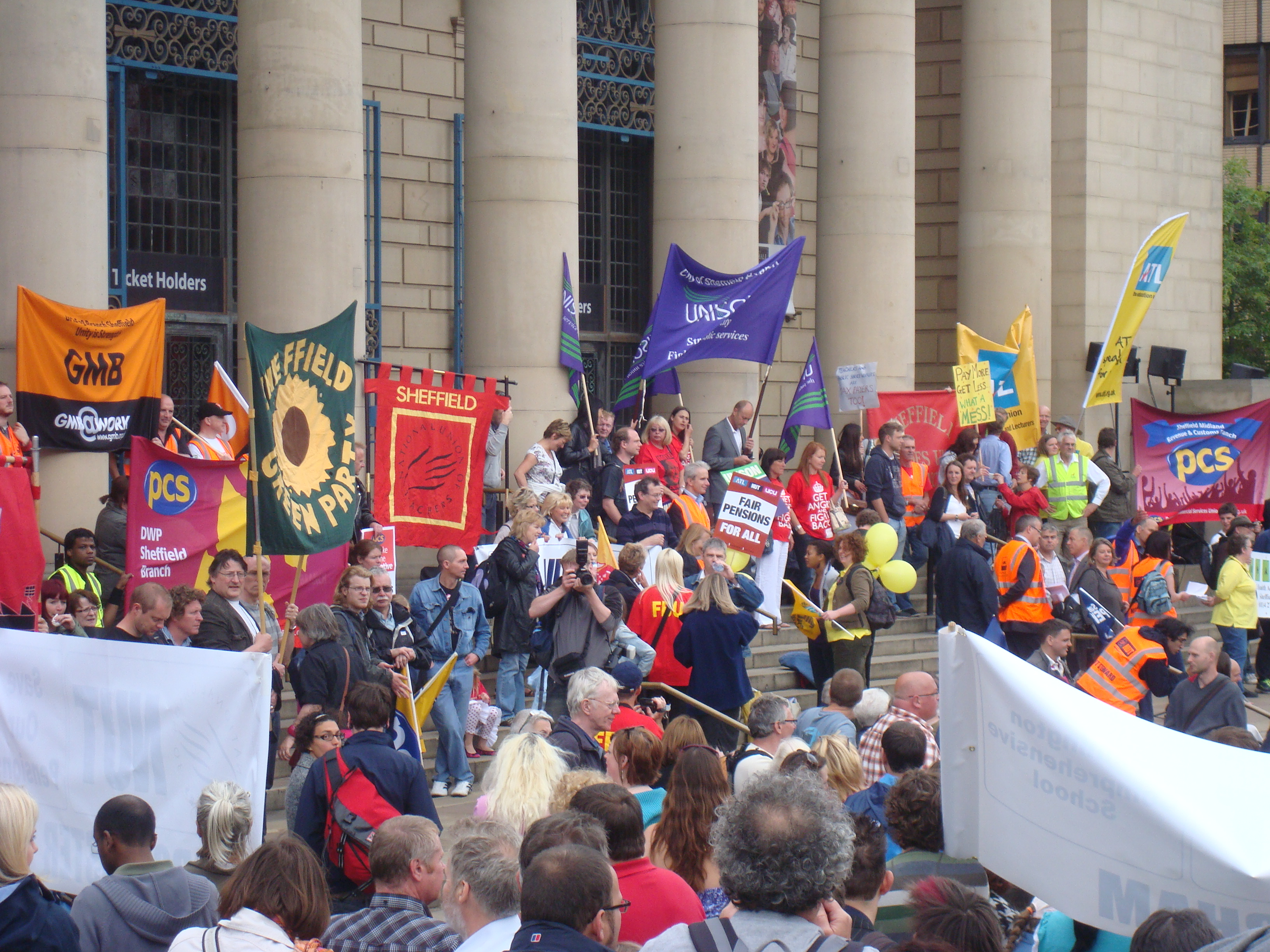
Protestors gather in Sheffield to demonstrate against government plans to change public sector pensions.

About 1,500 people gathered for a rally, picketing, speeches, a march and a political sing-song in the centre of Sheffield. A series of trades union speakers addressed the rallying crowd of teachers, civil servants and students outside Sheffield City Hall. There were protests at a few schools in the Sheffield area by students against the teacher's strikes, with several almost descending into violence. There were also small protests at Gleadless Townend (which caused disruption to bus services and car traffic as they blocked roads, but let trams through), at nearby Manor Top, and near Spring Lane tram stop.

Cumbria's annual Schoolympics sports day was cancelled as staff downed tools. Approximately 200 public-sector workers rallied in Carlisle and PCS members picketed the Rural Payments Agency, in Carlisle, and the British Cattle Movement Service, in Workington. A schools strike hit Brampton, so parents hired the community centre between 1230 and 1530 to take their children along for a £2 entry fee.

More over 100 primary schools in Kingston upon Hull had voluntary closed their doors.

Several schools were disrupted by strikes in Middlesbrough, Guisborough, Hartlepool and Redcar

== Wales ==
Almost 40,000 public-sector workers in Wales joined the one-day strike and Trades Union-led rallies hit Cardiff as an estimated 1,000 schools and some Government buildings were closed by the walk-outs and picketing. Approximately 40,000 public sector workers were called out to strike. Around 1,000 schools closed as more than 17,000 teachers walked out and dozens of government buildings and services were also shut. The lecturers at the University and College Union (the UCU) were also taking action at the Coleg Gwent campuses in Ebbw Vale, Cross Keys, Pontypool, Usk and Newport, as well as at the University of Wales, Newport campuses in the city centre and at Caerleon.

In Cardiff 700 protesters marched to the Welsh Assembly buildings at Cathays Park.

The South Wales Argus reported that 1,133 of the ATL union members in Gwent went on strike. About 1,000 NUT staff were also on strike. The Public and Commercial Services union reported that they had 2,000 of their members in the area on strike. Union officials reported about 90% turnouts at the Passport Office and the Newport Department for Work and Pensions contact centre. The Public and Commercial Services union's members were on strike at the Office for National Statistics, the Intellectual Property Office, the Newport Passport Office, the Department for Work and Pensions contact centre in the centre of the city, the National Shared Service Centre for the prisons service in Celtic Springs, and local Job Centres. There was also a minor trades unions rally in the city.

About 40 of the 400 staff turned up for work at the Cwmbran DWP pension Centre, Pontypool's Coleg Gwent campus saw a minor rally by students with improvised flags and banners.

A single NUT picket stood watch outside Lliswerry High School, where seven teachers chose to go on strike.

Over 5,000 children in Conwy district were out of school at Coleg Llandrillo Cymru, 4 secondary schools and 34 primary were hit by strike action in Llandrillo and Conwy. Colwyn Bay's Town Councillor Christopher Perry condemned the strike as unnecessarily disruptive on local lives.

Powys' teachers joined the strike on 30 June. Neither Welshpool High School nor Maesydre Junior School had any teachers go on strike. A group of NUT members held a rally in Llandrindod Wells.

== Scotland ==
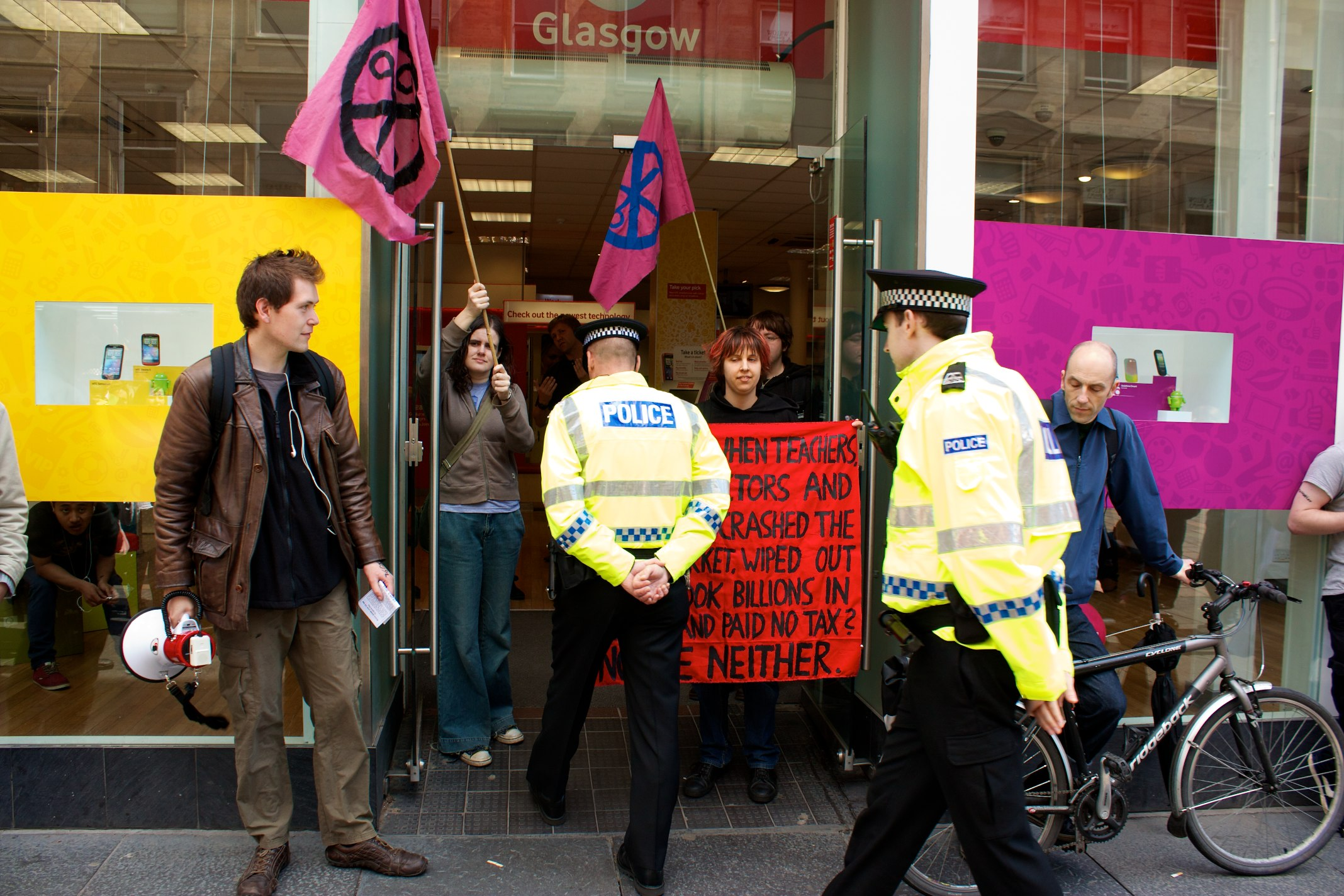
Police entered a Vodafone shop in Glasgow while 'UK Uncut' protestors picket the doorways with messages sympathetic to 30 June protest.

Fife's branch of the Department for Work and Pensions went on strike causing the closure of job centres, local pension providers and the Child Support Agency in and around Dunfermline.

Glasgow Sheriff Court was picketed. A rally was held in Glasgow's George Square that included members of the UNITE union, University, College Union and PCS members.

A minor rally took place at The Mound in Edinburgh, while picket lines were formed outside Edinburgh Castle, the Scottish Parliament and outside the government headquarters at St Andrew's House, Edinburgh The PCS claimed that 90% of its 30,000 Scottish members took part in the day of action.

The DVLA was shut in Glasgow, Dundee and Inverness, while Edinburgh and Aberdeen had reduced service.

The Scottish Courts Service reckoned that about 30% of its 1,622 staff had not gone to work, the Department for Work and Pensions said that the jobcentres in Kirkwall, Lerwick, Cambuslang and Rutherglen were closed.

There were picket lines at Faslane naval base.

== Northern Ireland ==
Up to 3,000 local members of the Public and Commercial Services union went on strike. The staff in local government departments and agencies including HM Revenue & Customs, UK Border Agency, NI Courts Service, Maritime & Coastguards Agency, Identity & Passport Services, Belfast International Airport, the Passport Office the British Council, the Ministry of Defence, Tax offices and courts. Most of this action was focused on Belfast.

Belfast International Airport and several government offices were picketed and had partial walk outs as a trades union rally took place in the city centre.

PCS picketing was also mounted outside government offices in Enniskillen, Derry, Coleraine, and Newry.
