= Driver CPC =

European qualification for bus, coach, and lorry drivers

The Driver Certificate of Professional Competence (Driver CPC) is a qualification for professional bus, coach and lorry drivers. It has been introduced across Europe with the aim of improving road safety and maintaining high standards of driving.

== What is Driver CPC? ==
Under a European Union Directive, professional drivers of lorries over 3.5 tonnes or Passenger Carrying Vehicles (PCV) with 9 or more seats must usually obtain a Driver CPC in addition to a vocational driving licence. See exemptions below.

New drivers obtain their Driver CPC by passing a series of initial qualification tests with both theory and practical sections. This must be maintained with 35 hours of periodic training every 5 years or the certificate will lapse.

Bus and coach (PCV) drivers who hold a relevant vocational licence (D, D1, D+E and D1+E) gained before 10 September 2008, (including restricted vocational licence D(101) issued after 1991 and D1(101) issued before 1997) and lorry (LGV) drivers who obtained their licence (C, C1, C+E and C1+E) before 10 September 2009, do not need to take the initial qualification as they are deemed to hold 'acquired rights'. They must still complete periodic training to maintain their Driver CPC.

New drivers who pass the initial qualification tests will receive a "Driver Qualification Card" (DQC), or alternatively community code 95 will be added to their driving licence to show that they hold a Driver CPC.

Drivers who have acquired rights receive their DQC when they have completed their first 35 hours of periodic training. Their DQC is valid until 9 September 2018 for PCV drivers, and until 9 September 2019 for LGV drivers. Drivers with licences for both PCV and LGV are covered by one DQC which is valid until 9 September 2019.

== Initial qualification ==
The initial Driver CPC qualification is split into four parts. These include the theory and practical tests drivers will need to pass before they can gain their full vocational driving licence.

The other two parts are optional and need be taken only if the driver requires the full Driver CPC to allow them to drive buses, coaches or lorries professionally. This gives drivers the flexibility to obtain their vocational licence only, or to gain full Driver CPC at the same time.

=== Driver CPC theory tests ===
Part one – Theory test

The theory test is made up of 2 parts 1) a multiple choice test and 2) a hazard perception test. The multiple choice test lasts 1hr 55 minutes and contains 100 questions. The current pass mark is 85%. The hazard perception part of the theory test consists of 19 video clips, with a total of 20 score-able hazards. Every hazard is worth a maximum of 5 marks and a score of 67% is required to earn a pass.

The driver must take both tests separately and it doesn't matter in which order the driver completes them. As long as both tests are passed within 2 years of each other the driver will get a theory test certificate. Once the driver has passed Driver CPC module 1 the driver must pass the Driver CPC module 3 driving test within 2 years, otherwise the driver will have to pass the module 1 theory test again.

Part two – Case studies

The test consists of seven case studies the driver works through on a computer. The case studies are basically short scenarios based on situations that are highly likely to happen in one's working life as a lorry driver. The test has been written by industry experts and uses realistic scenarios that a lorry driver may encounter when out on the road. The driver is asked between six and eight multiple choice questions on each of the seven case studies. The whole test lasts for 1 hour 55 minutes and the pass mark is 80%.

A pass letter is valid for two years and the driver must complete and pass the Driver CPC module 4 practical demonstration test within 2 years, otherwise the driver will have to complete module 2 case studies test again.

=== Practical tests ===
Part three – Licence acquisition (practical test of driving ability)

The driving ability test is a practical test that lasts for approximately 1 hour and 30 minutes and includes:

- Vehicle safety questions
- Practical road driving
- Off-road exercises

Part four – Driver CPC practical test (vehicle safety demonstration)

The Driver CPC Module 4 is an interactive test where the driver is expected to demonstrate and explain a number of operations that are required by a lorry driver other than the driving itself. For this module, the driver is tested on being able to:

- Load the vehicle following the correct safety rules and ensure the load is kept secure
- Prevent trafficking in illegal immigrants
- Assess emergency situations
- Do a complete walk round vehicle safety check

To get the full Driver CPC qualification, drivers must pass all four parts. If they want to get a vocational licence, but will not be driving for a living, they will only need to take and pass part one and part three.

== Periodic training ==
All drivers need to complete 35 hours of periodic training every five years on an ongoing basis to keep driving for a living. Drivers can check their Driver CPC periodic training record online to see how many hours they have done. Periodic training is delivered through courses that drivers attend over the five-year period for which their current Driver CPC is valid. There is no pass or fail element to these tests. The minimum length of a training course is seven hours, although they may be longer. Where a course of seven hours is split into two parts, the second part must start within 24 hours of the first part ending. Driver CPC courses must be approved by JAUPT. The training provider will upload the driver's completed training hours to the DVSA website for a small administrative charge.

Each new five-year period will begin from the expiry date of the driver's current Driver CPC qualification, and not from the date on which they reached the 35 hours' minimum training requirement.

Drivers of PCV vehicles prior to 10 September 2008 had to complete their first block of 35 hours of training and have their DQC issued by 9 September 2013. The deadline to complete their second block of training is 9 September 2018.

Drivers of LGV vehicles prior to 10 September 2009 had to complete 35 hours of training and have their DQC issued by 9 September 2014. The deadline to complete their second block of training is 9 September 2019.

Drivers of both PCV and LGV vehicles only need to do one set of periodic training every 5 years.

== Exemptions ==
Drivers do not need a Driver CPC if the vehicle they drive:

- has a maximum authorised speed not exceeding 45 kilometres per hour
- is used by, or under the control of, the armed forces, civil defence, the fire service and forces responsible for maintaining public order
- is undergoing road tests for technical development, repair or maintenance purposes, or is a new or rebuilt vehicle which has not yet been put into service
- is used in states of emergency or assigned to rescue missions
- is used in the course of driving lessons for any person wishing to obtain a driving licence or a Driver CPC
- is used for non-commercial carriage of passengers and/or goods or for personal use
- is carrying material or equipment to be used by the driver in the course of his or her work, provided that driving the vehicle is not the driver's principal activity
- is on a technical road test (to diagnose a fault or validate after a repair)

== Enforcement ==
- Unless a driver has 'acquired or Grandfather clause rights', they will be issued with a DQC once they pass the Driver CPC initial qualification tests.
- Drivers with acquired rights can not use their existing driving licence as proof of their Driver Licence which they are required to complete the periodic training.
- Drivers must always carry evidence of their Driver CPC status while driving professionally. If they are found driving while not in possession of a DQC - or a valid driving licence if they have acquired rights - they will be liable for penalties.
- The Driver CPC is enforced in all European Union (EU) member states. If the driver is driving in another EU country, they must still hold a valid Driver CPC, unless they have an exemption.
