= Driving Standards Agency =

Former executive agency in the UK

- Abbreviation: DSA
- Formation: 1 April 1990
- Dissolved: 31 March 2014
- Type: Government agency (Trading fund)
- Purpose: Administration of UK driving tests
- Headquarters: The Axis Building
- Location: Upper Parliament Street, Nottingham, UK
- Region served: Great Britain
- Chief Executive: Alastair Peoples
- Main organ: Executive Board
- Parent organization: Department for Transport
- Affiliations: VOSA, DVLA, VCA
- Budget: £176m (2008)
- Staff: 2,653
- Website: gov.uk/dsa

The Driving Standards Agency (DSA) was an executive agency of the UK Department for Transport (DfT).

DSA promoted road safety in Great Britain by improving driving and motorcycling standards. It set standards for education and training, as well as carrying out theory and practical driving and riding tests.

The responsibilities of DSA only covered Great Britain. In Northern Ireland the same role was carried out by the Driver & Vehicle Agency (DVA).

It was announced on 20 June 2013 that DSA would merge with the Vehicle and Operator Services Agency into a single agency in 2014. The name of the new agency was confirmed as the Driver and Vehicle Standards Agency (DVSA) on 28 November 2013. The DSA was abolished on 31 March 2014, and the DVSA took over its responsibilities on 1 April 2014.

== Profile ==
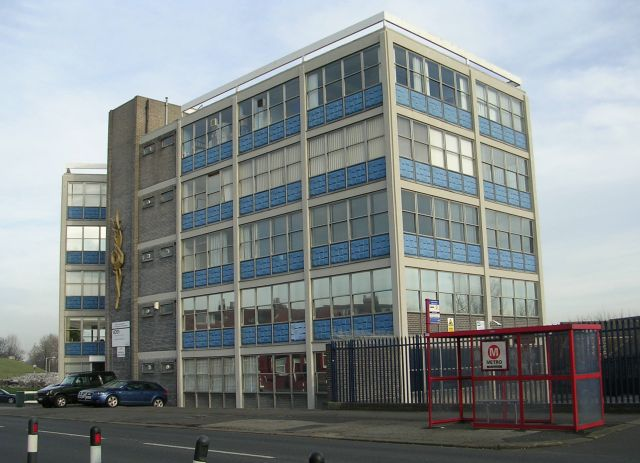
A DSA test centre in Harehills, Leeds.

The DSA was a national organisation with headquarters in Nottingham, training and learning materials centre at Cardington in Bedfordshire and administrative centres in Cardiff and Newcastle.

DSA employed around 2,400 staff around Great Britain and ran tests from around 400 practical driving test centres. Theory tests were carried out at around 150 theory test centres.

DSA was a Trading Fund with a turnover of over £184 million in 2009-10 mainly funded through fees and revenue from other road safety initiatives.

=== Aims and objectives ===
The DSA's mission and primary aim was to continually promote road safety by influencing driver and rider behaviour, which it did through:

- setting the standards for pre-driver education and driver trainers
- registering and supervising quality assured Approved Driving Instructors
- carrying out theory and practical driving and riding tests
- quality assurance of all testing activity
- investigating cases of suspected theory test and practical test impersonations and identity fraud
- developing the future education and testing environment through its Learning to Drive programme

=== Resources ===
The DSA employed 1,789 practical driving examiners, and 728 administrative staff and managers. It planned to employ a total of 2,769 staff by March 2011, dependent on trading and the government freeze on recruitment.

=== Board structure ===
The chief executive was accountable to the Secretary of State for ensuring that the DSA met its obligations and delivered its targets and services. The chief executive had overall responsibility for the DSA's activities, ensuring it met its financial obligations, and providing assurance of a sound system of internal control. The Director General of Motoring and Freight Services was the additional accounting officer.

The chief executive was supported by an executive board, including two non-executive directors. The executive board's role was to provide support and advice, and met monthly.

A separate audit and risk management committee, comprising non-executive directors, acted independently of the executive board to provide assurance to the chief executive on financial and non-financial matters, including corporate governance and risk management.

The change board, attended by the chief executive and appropriate directors, oversaw the development and effective management of the DSA's investment plan of change projects and programmes, and met monthly.

The operational performance group, which also met monthly, was chaired by the operations director and attended by senior managers, and monitored performance against targets and business plan objectives.

== Theory and practical driving tests ==
Before learning to drive a car, moped or motorcycle, a provisional driving licence must be obtained. If a driver already holds a valid full driving licence but wishes to drive larger vehicles, minibuses or buses, provisional entitlement for these categories of vehicle is required.

For those holding a provisional licence, taking the theory test is the next step before acquiring a full licence. For cars and motorcycles candidates are asked 50 questions in 57 minutes and the pass mark is 43 out of 50. For lorries and buses, there are 100 questions in 115 minutes and the pass mark is 85 out of 100.

The hazard perception test is the second part of the driving theory test. Both parts must be passed in order to pass the theory test. If successful, one can then apply to take the practical driving test.

The practical test starts with an eyesight check and some vehicle safety questions. The driving part of the test lasts about 40 minutes, and involves performing some specific manoeuvres as well as demonstrating an overall safe standard of driving. A candidate may make up to 15 minor driving faults but still pass the test (16 or more results in failure). However, if one serious or dangerous fault is committed, then the test is failed. The current pass rate for car 'L' tests is 43%.

The cost of the theory test is now £31, and the practical car test is £62 if taken on weekdays or £75 if taken at weekends or weekday evenings.

To help candidates fully prepare for their theory and practical driving and motorcycle tests, The Stationery Office (TSO), DSA's official publishing partner, produces a range of best-selling official publications. These include The Official DSA Theory Test for Car Drivers (available as a book, CD-ROM or interactive download), The Official DSA Complete Theory Test Kit (CD-ROM and DVD pack) and The Official DSA Guide to Driving – the essential skills (available as a book or downloadable PDF). The full range of titles is available from The Stationery Office online bookshop.

== Driving test fees ==
Driving test fees
test type	before July 2005	July 2005–April 2006	April 2006	April 2008	January 2010
Car and motorcycle theory test	£21.50	£21.00	£21.50	£30.00	£31.00
Lorry and bus theory test	no information	no information	no information	£45.00	£50.00
ADI part I theory test	no information	no information	no information	£80.00	£90.00
Car practical test (standard weekday)	£42.00	£45.50	£48.50	£56.50	£62.00
Car practical test (standard out of hours)	no information	no information	no information	£67.50	£75.00
Car practical test (extended weekday)	no information	no information	no information	£113.00	£124.00
Car practical test (extended out of hours)	no information	no information	no information	£134.00	£150.00
Motorcycle practical test (standard weekday)	£51.00	£55.00	£58.00	£60.00	£90.50
Motorcycle practical test (standard out of hours)	no information	no information	no information	£70.00	£104.00
Motorcycle practical test (extended weekday)	no information	no information	no information	£120.00	£165.50
Motorcycle practical test (extended out of hours)	no information	no information	no information	£140.00	£192.50
Domestic licence (category F, G, H and K) practical test (standard)	no information	no information	no information	£56.50	£62.00
Domestic licence (category F, G, H and K) practical test (out of hours)	no information	no information	no information	£67.50	£75.00
Car with trailer, lorry and bus practical test (standard)	£80.00	£85.00	£89.00	£105.00	£115.00
Car with trailer, lorry and bus practical test (out of hours)	no information	no information	no information	£125.00	£141.00
Driver CPC Module 4 practical test (standard)	not conducted	not conducted	not conducted	not conducted	£55.00
Driver CPC Module 4 practical test (out of hours)	not conducted	not conducted	not conducted	not conducted	£63.00
ADI part II practical test	£70.00	£79.00	£82.00	£99.00	£111.00
ADI part III Ability to Instruct test	£70.00	£79.00	£82.00	£111.00	£111.00
Driving instructor trainee licence	£100.00	£125.00	no change	no change	£140.00
Theory test pass certificates for organisations with delegated authority (car and motorcycle)	£10.00	£12.00	£14.00	£18.50 >03/Sep/2007	no change
Theory test pass certificates for organisations with delegated authority (lorry and bus)	no information	no information	no information	£29.00	no change

The last increases prior to July 2005 were:

- Practical car and motorcycling test: 2002
- Lorry and bus tests: 2001
- Driving instructor test: 1997

Sources: http://www.dft.gov.uk/dsa/PressRelease.asp?id=4206 http://www.dft.gov.uk/dsa/PressRelease.asp?id=145

== Driving instructor registration ==
The DSA held a register of Approved Driving Instructors (ADIs) in Great Britain. The ADI Registrar also issues trainee licences to give instruction. In order to qualify as an ADI, three tests must be passed:

- theory (part one) - a multiple choice section and a video-based hazard perception section;
- driving ability (part two) - an eyesight test followed by a practical test of driving technique;
- instructional ability (part three) - a practical test of the ability to instruct.

All three parts of the examination must be passed in this order, and must be completed within two years of passing the theory test (part one).

After being entered on the ADI register, ADIs are free to give driving instruction for money or monies worth, either working for a driving school or being self-employed. It is a condition of remaining on the register that all ADIs undergo a periodic "test of continued ability of fitness to give instruction" also known as the 'check test'. The passage of the Road Safety Act 2006 empowered DSA to set the standards on all paid tuition, not just that of motor cars as was previously the case.

The DSA required people who applied to register as a Potential Driving Instructor (PDI), as well as existing ADIs who applied to extend their registration or re-register, to have a criminal record check. DSA used the Criminal Records Bureau (CRB) to obtain criminal record checks of people in England and Wales, and Disclosure Scotland for people in Scotland.

Some ADIs choose to take additional qualifications so that they can train drivers of large goods vehicles, or fleet drivers. The DSA also held a voluntary register for fleet drivers, Compulsory Basic Trainers (for motorcycles), Large Goods Vehicle instructors and the Register of post-test motorcycle trainers. These registers provided quality standards for the relevant discipline, but were not necessary for paid tuition.

== 'Learning to Drive' programme ==
Following consultation, Ministers decided to proceed with a programme of measures, based on education and incentivisation, to strengthen the way that people learn to drive and are tested, and encourage a culture of lifelong learning.

DSA planned a phased implementation programme, supporting progressive improvements whilst avoiding disruption to those currently learning to drive.

Early improvements were:

- continued roll out across Great Britain of the new pre-driver qualification in safe road use
- introduction from October 2009 of:
  - a partial credit towards the theory test for car drivers for those students awarded the new pre-driver qualification in the form of an abridged theory test
  - case studies into the theory test for car drivers and moped and motorcycle riders to better assess whether learners have understood driving or riding theory
- the launch in 2009/10 of a trial to assess the effectiveness of the proposed new learning to drive syllabus and process
- introduction from October 2010 of a requirement for the supervising driver to accompany the candidate during a practical car test
- subject to the outcome of the trialling, from October 2010 the introduction into all DSA practical tests for learner drivers of an assessment of competence whilst the candidate is driving independently.

== Websites ==
DSA moved its information about learning to drive and ride to Directgov and its information for businesses to Business Link. This was part of the Transformational Government strategy. Its corporate information, which included how the agency was run, consultations, and press releases, was moved to the Department for Transport website.

All DSA's information about learning to drive and ride and for businesses moved to the single government website GOV.UK on 17 October 2012.

DSA became one of the first central government organisations to move its corporate and policy content onto the GOV.UK website on 15 November 2012.

=== Social media ===
DSA announced the launch of its own video sharing channel on YouTube on 22 September 2009. The channel – youtube.com/dsagov – was used to post road safety videos which offer advice to test candidates and other road users.

The DSA also operated a Twitter channel - twitter.com/dsagovuk and a Facebook page - facebook.com/dsagovuk.

== See also ==
- Driving examiner (United Kingdom)
- Driver and Vehicle Licensing Agency (DVLA)
- Driver and Vehicle Standards Agency (DVSA)
- National Highways
- Vehicle and Operator Services Agency (VOSA) - administers the MOT
