= Vehicle and Operator Services Agency =

- Abbreviation: VOSA

Agency overview
- Formed: 3 April 2003
- Preceding agencies: Vehicle Inspectorate; Traffic Area Network
- Dissolved: 31 March 2014
- Annual budget: £197 million

Jurisdictional structure
- National agency (Operations jurisdiction): UK
- Operations jurisdiction: UK
- Legal jurisdiction: England, Wales and Scotland

Operational structure
- Parent agency: Department for Transport

Website
- www.gov.uk/vosa

Vehicle and Operator Services Agency (VOSA) was an executive agency granted trading fund status in the United Kingdom sponsored by the Department for Transport of the United Kingdom Government.

It was announced on 20 June 2013 that VOSA would merge with the Driving Standards Agency into a single agency in 2014. The name of the new agency was confirmed as the Driver and Vehicle Standards Agency (DVSA) on 28 November 2013. VOSA was abolished on 31 March 2014, and its responsibilities passed to the DVSA on 1 April 2014.

== History ==
The Agency was created from the merger of the Vehicle Inspectorate (VI) and the Traffic Area Network (TAN). The public are most aware of its activities through its regulation of the MOT vehicle inspection test in Great Britain. VOSA are generally better known by commercial vehicle operators as "The Ministry", a throwback to the days of the former Ministry of Transport (MOT). In Northern Ireland this role is performed by the Driver & Vehicle Agency.

In 2005 it had approximately 2,500 staff, 1,700 of which are based at its lorry testing garages across Great Britain.

Chief Executives

Maurice Newey had been appointed chief executive of the Vehicle Inspectorate in 1998 and became the first chief executive of VOSA in 2003.

Stephen Tetlow, joined VOSA as Chief Executive in December 2004 following the retirement of Newey.

Alastair Peoples took over from Tetlow as Chief Executive in 2008 until 2014 when VOSA and DSA merged to form DVSA

=== Enforcement charges ===
Its examiners have been granted the ability to issue fixed penalty tickets from 1 April 2009. These cover a range of offences including breaches of drivers hours legislation, overloaded vehicles and also mechanical defects. These tickets can be issued to both UK and foreign nationals.

In the first 3 months since the implementation of fixed penalties, the Agency has taken more than £500,000 in fines.

== Intent ==
- To improve road safety and the environment and safeguard fair competition by promoting and enforcing compliance with commercial operator licensing requirements;
- Processing applications for licences to operate lorries and buses;
- Registering bus services;
- Operating and administering testing schemes for all vehicles, including the supervision of the MOT Testing Scheme;
- Enforcing the law on vehicles to ensure that they comply with legal standards and regulations;
- Enforcing drivers' hours and licensing requirements;
- Providing training and advice for commercial operators; and
- Investigating vehicle accidents, defects and recalls.

== Customers ==
Its customers were the Road Haulage and Public Service Vehicle (PSV) industries, trade associations, vehicle manufacturers, MOT garages, and offenders and defendants.

== Powers to stop vehicles ==
Under the Police Reform Act 2002, section 41 and Schedule 5, Chief Constables could grant powers (under a Community Safety Accreditation Scheme) to VOSA officers to stop vehicles, for checks on vehicle and driver compliance without the need for police support (later expanded to stop any vehicle, although mainly goods and passenger carrying vehicles). At that time, only police officers had the power to stop vehicles and therefore had to be present. The powers were piloted in 2003 and brought more widely into force in 2004.

Following a consultation in July 2010, the law was overhauled in 2011 to grant VOSA officers the power to stop vehicles without relying on police approval through Community Safety Accreditation Schemes as above. This also allowed VOSA officers to stop vehicles in Scotland, as well as in England and Wales as previously. The amendment, which was made by the Road Vehicles (Powers to Stop) Regulations 2011, allows "stopping officers" approved by the Department for Transport to stop vehicles for certain reasons.

To be appointed as a stopping officer, a person must:

- be a suitable person to exercise the powers of a stopping officer,
- be capable of effectively exercising their powers, and
- have received adequate training for the exercise of their powers.

Officers must be in uniform to stop vehicles. Impersonating or obstructing stopping officers is an offence.

== VOSA vehicles ==
VOSA employ a fleet of Ford Galaxy vehicles in black and yellow battenburg livery and clearly marked with "VOSA" on the rear. These are fitted with amber lightbars on the roof. This is a similar livery to that of the Highways Agency (HA) traffic officer service in England and the Welsh Assembly Government Traffic Officer Service in Wales.

== See also ==
- Weighbridge
- TransXChange format for UK electronic bus schedule registration
- Federal Motor Carrier Safety Administration, an American government agency responsible for regulating that country's trucking industry
