= Driving licence in the United Kingdom =

UK Driving Licence; Trwydded Yrru
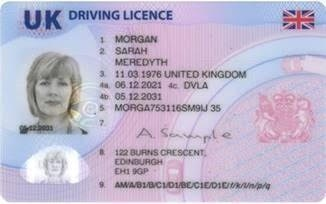
- Example of a driving licence issued in Great Britain after December 2021

- Example of a driving licence issued in Northern Ireland after December 2021
- Type: Driving licence
- Issued by: United Kingdom
- Purpose: Authorisation
- Expiration: Provisional and full photocard licences are valid for 10 years.; Paper licences issued before March 2000 valid until 70 years old (If no change of name or address)
- Cost: Provisional: £34/£43 (online/postal) (GB), £62.50 (Northern Ireland) Renewal: £14/£17 (online/postal) (GB), £30 (Northern Ireland)

In the United Kingdom, a driving licence is the official document which authorises its holder to operate motor vehicles on highways and other public roads. It is administered in England, Scotland and Wales by the Driver and Vehicle Licensing Agency (DVLA) and in Northern Ireland by the Driver & Vehicle Agency (DVA). A driving licence is required in England, Scotland, and Wales for any person (except the sovereign) driving a vehicle on any highway or other "road", as defined in s.192 Road Traffic Act 1988, irrespective of the ownership of the land over which the road passes. Similar requirements apply in Northern Ireland under the Road Traffic (Northern Ireland) Order 1981.

Prior to the UK leaving the European Union on 31 January 2020 and during the transition period which ended on 31 December 2020, a UK driving licence was a European driving licence, adhering to Directive 2006/126/EC and valid throughout the European Economic Area. A new updated design has been issued from January 2021, now simply reading "UK" in larger blue letters, where the EU flag with the circle of stars surrounding the "UK" code was.

Since July 2015, all UK driving licence photo-cards issued by the DVLA have displayed the Union Flag, and since December 2021 also the Royal Coat of Arms on the front of the driving licence. This does not apply to driving licences issued by the DVA in Northern Ireland.

Individuals with a GB address cannot apply for a Northern Ireland (DVA) issued driving licence and individuals with a Northern Ireland address cannot apply for a GB (DVLA) issued driving licence. Both forms of the licence are considered as a full UK driving licence and have equal status.

In Northern Ireland, the paper counterpart is still issued and must be produced when a licence is requested by the PSNI or when taking a practical driving test. If this counterpart is lost, stolen or damaged, a replacement licence must be ordered. This will replace both the photo-card and counterpart.

There is no UK identity card; a photographic driving licence can serve as proof of identity in non-driving contexts, such as proof of identity (e.g. when opening a bank account) or of age (e.g. when buying age-restricted goods such as alcohol or tobacco).

== Regulations ==
Non-professional drivers are not required to carry a driving licence while driving, but section 164 of the Road Traffic Act 1988 and earlier legislation allows a police officer to require a driver to produce a driving licence within seven days at a police station chosen by the driver. The form which was once issued in such circumstances, the HO/RT 1, was known colloquially as "a producer".

=== Provisional licences and learner drivers ===
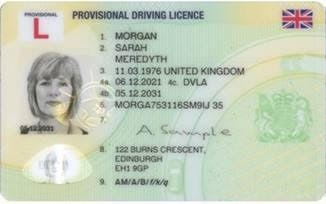
Example of a provisional driving licence issued in Great Britain after December 2021

Example of a provisional driving licence issued in Northern Ireland after December 2021

Applications for a provisional driving licence can be made in Great Britain from the age of 15 years and 9 months and in Northern Ireland from 16 years and 10 months. Once a United Kingdom driving test has been passed, the driving licence is valid for driving a moped or light quad bike from age 16, and a car from age 17, or 16 for those who receive, or have applied for, the higher or enhanced rate of the mobility component of PIP or DLA. A driving test consists of three sections: theory, hazard perception and a driving examination. Until this test has been passed, a driver may hold only a provisional licence and is subject to certain conditions. The conditions attached to provisional licences for a particular category of vehicle are:

L plate

D plate (Wales)

Learner driver plates in the UK
- L-plates or D-plates (in Wales only) (Welsh: Dysgwr, "learner") must be conspicuously displayed on the front and rear of the vehicle.
- Learner drivers of a particular category and transmission type of vehicle must be accompanied by somebody aged 21 or above who has held a full driving licence for that category and transmission type for at least three years, except in the case of solo motorcycles and vehicles of certain categories designed solely for one person.
- No trailer may be towed, except when driving a tractor or where a full licence gives provisional entitlement to drive a car with trailer, large goods vehicle with trailer or passenger carrying vehicle with trailer.
- Motorcycle riders must not carry any pillion passengers.
- Coach or bus drivers must not carry any passenger except a person giving or receiving instruction.
- Motorways must not be used by holders of car and motorcycle provisional licences, excluding category B (car) licence holders who are learner drivers for the purposes of the trailer category BE, or unless supervised by an Approved Driving Instructor (ADI) in a car fitted with dual controls.

In Northern Ireland, learner drivers are limited to a speed of 45 mph (72 km/h) and are not permitted on motorways regardless of whether or not they are under instruction by an ADI, and drivers who have passed their test within the previous year must display R plates (restricted) and are also limited to a maximum speed of 45 mph (72 km/h) until the expiry of the restricted period. R plates are similar in style to L-plates, with a thick-set dark orange R displayed on a white background and most L plates have the orange R on the reverse side.

After passing a driving test, the provisional licence may be surrendered within two years in exchange for a full UK licence for the relevant kind of vehicle. Full car licences allow use of mopeds and motorcycles provided a CBT (Compulsory Basic Training) course is completed (the requirement to have a CBT in Northern Ireland was introduced on 21 February 2011).

=== Newly qualified drivers ===
R plate that must be displayed by restricted drivers in Northern Ireland

P plates that some new drivers choose to display in Great Britain

There are currently no restrictions on newly qualified drivers in England, Wales or Scotland. However, if a newly qualified driver receives six penalty points within two years of passing, the licence is automatically revoked, and the driver must pass the full test again; this also applies in Northern Ireland. These six points remain on the new licence until their designated expiry time.

In Great Britain, some new drivers may display green "P" plates ("probationary") on their vehicle to alert other drivers that they have recently passed their driving test. This is optional and not a legal requirement and may be displayed for as long as desired. P plates are not commonly used in Northern Ireland.

In Northern Ireland, new drivers must display orange "R" plates for 1 year after passing the test, and are limited to a maximum speed of 45 mph (72 km/h). This is a legal requirement and failure to display R plates results in 2 penalty points and a fine. These drivers are known as restricted drivers.

In the Isle of Man (a UK Crown dependency), new drivers must display "R" plates similar to those in Northern Ireland, but red, for 1 year after passing the test, and are limited to a maximum speed of 50 mph (80 km/h).

=== Towing restrictions ===
The rules on what a driver can tow are different depending on when they passed their driving test. If they passed their car driving test on or after 1 January 1997, they may drive a car or van up to 3,500 kg (7,700 lb) maximum authorised mass (MAM) towing a trailer of up to 750 kg (1,650 lb) MAM, and they may tow a trailer over 750 kg (1,650 lb) MAM as long as the combined MAM of the trailer and towing vehicle is no more than 3,500 kg (7,700 lb) MAM when loaded. They must pass the car and trailer driving test to tow anything heavier. If a driver passed their car test before 1 January 1997, they are usually allowed to drive a vehicle and trailer combination up to 8,250 kg (18,190 lb) MAM. They are also allowed to drive a minibus with a trailer over 750 kg (1,650 lb) MAM.

On 16 September 2021, the Secretary of State for Transport laid a statutory instrument to retrospectively grant the BE (car and trailer) entitlement to all GB category B licence holders. From 15 November 2021, all GB standard car licence holders have been permitted to tow a trailer with a MAM of up to 3,500 kg (7,700 lb). An additional legislative change from 16 December 2021 means that drivers with B (car) entitlement also automatically receive BE (car with trailer) entitlement without the need to take a BE test. This allows them to tow vehicles up to 3,500 kg maximum authorised mass (MAM).

=== Other regulations ===
Motor car licences issued in the United Kingdom distinguish between automatic and manual transmission vehicles, depending on whether or not a driving test was passed in a vehicle with manual transmission (unless a vehicle test was taken in the UK before such distinction was made). While a manual transmission vehicle licence permits the holder to drive a vehicle of either kind, an automatic transmission vehicle licence is solely for vehicles with automatic transmission. The licence also shows whether a driver requires glasses or contact lenses to meet the legal driving requirements, if known.

Drivers who obtained rights to drive category D1 minibuses before 1997 (by passing a test for the obsolete class A) must not drive such vehicles for hire or reward, nor accept any form of payment in money, goods or kind from any passengers carried.

Category B licences automatically cover both groups C1 (lorries not exceeding 7.5 tonnes MAM) and D1 but as the holder approaches 45, they must renew their licence. They must provide a doctor's medical report plus an optometrist's report (if the doctor cannot certify the eyesight requirement). Anyone who has C1 and D1 rights on an older paper licence (before the photocard licence) retains the right to drive C1 and D1 without medical evidence until age 70 (so-called grandfather rights), though, like any responsible driver, should have regular eye checks.

There is no maximum age for driving or holding a driving licence, but holders must renew their licences at age 70 and every three years thereafter, at which times they must provide evidence of a medical exam and separate eyesight test if the right to drive C1 and D1 vehicles is to be retained.

== History ==
Driver registration was introduced in 1903 with the Motor Car Act. Holders of the sulphur-yellow coloured document were entitled to "drive a motor car or motor cycle". The wording was changed in 1930 after which holders were allowed to "drive or steer a motor car or to drive a motor cycle". Shortly afterwards, the document cover was changed to a dark red colour. Holders were for a period entitled to drive a vehicle of "any class or description". Subsequent changes saw the document list precisely those vehicle types for which holders were licensed.

Competency tests were introduced by the Motor Vehicles Regulations 1935 applicable to all drivers who started driving after 1 April 1934. Competency tests were suspended in 1939 for seven years due to the Second World War and in 1956 for one year due to the Suez Crisis. The only person in the United Kingdom who is not required to have a driving licence in order to drive, or display a number plate on a vehicle, is the reigning monarch.

Until 1974, driving licences (and tax discs) were issued by local authorities and had to be renewed every three years. In 1968, the decision was taken to computerise the licensing system to enable it to be linked to the Police National Computer and to extend the life of the licence up to the driver's 70th birthday, extendable at intervals thereafter provided the driver can prove fitness.

Except for Northern Ireland, driving licences issued before July 1998 did not have photographs on them. Anyone who holds a licence issued before this date may retain their photo-less licence until expiry (normally one's seventieth birthday) or until they change address, whichever comes sooner. The new plastic photocard driving licences have to be renewed every ten years, for a fee. Until 2015, the licence consisted of both the photocard and a paper counterpart which detailed the individual's driving entitlements and convictions ("endorsements"). The counterpart was abolished on 8 June 2015 and the information formerly recorded on it is now available online via the View Driving Licence service, except in Northern Ireland where the counterpart must be kept with the photocard.

Licences issued to residents of England, Northern Ireland and Scotland appear only in English, while those issued to residents of Wales appear in both English and Welsh. The Union Flag has been included on GB licences since July 2015, but not on Northern Ireland licences. Since December 2021 the Royal Coat of Arms is included on GB licences.

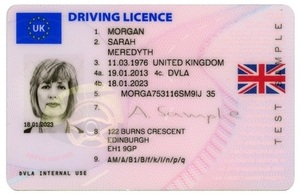
British driving licences followed EU standards until 2021, when the transition period ended.

Until 28 September 2021, the distinguishing sign of the United Kingdom was "GB". The allocation of codes is maintained by the United Nations Economic Commission for Europe, authorised by the UN's Geneva Convention on Road Traffic and the Vienna Convention on Road Traffic. The UK is party to both conventions, and shall hence issue licences in conformity with the conventions. Annex 9 of the Geneva convention states that the distinguishing sign (UK) shall be inscribed in an oval. According to the Vienna convention Article 43 domestic licences have to comply with Annex 6, which says that driving licences shall include the name and/or the distinguishing sign of the country which issued the permit. UK licences did include the "GB" distinguishing code until 1990.

Example of a driving licence issued in Great Britain between January 2021 and December 2021

From 1 July 1994, Directive 91/439/EEC required EU Member States to include the emblem of the EU. When the UK was part of the EU, instead of its distinguishing sign "GB", it used the code "UK" inside the EU emblem on driving licences and followed EU driving licence standards. The UK subsequently withdrew from the EU and the EU flag is no longer featured on UK driving licences issued after the transition period ended on 31 December 2020. The "GB" code or the ellipse from the aforementioned conventions have not been reintroduced; since January 2021, the licences simply read “UK" in larger blue letters where the EU flag with the circle of stars surrounding the "UK" code used to be. The licences' layout, categories and restrictions remain identical to EU driving licences after the Withdrawal Agreement (Brexit).

On 30 June 2021, the United Nations published a notification stating that the United Kingdom had given three months notification that it intended to change its distinguishing sign from "GB" to "UK". This came into effect on 28 September 2021.

From 16 December 2021, all GB driving licence holders who passed their test after 1997 became automatically entitled to a BE licence (car with a heavy trailer). This change does not apply to NI driving licence holders. In some cases, these BE rights will not be transferrable to EU licences.

Since December 2021, new driving licence styles were introduced. Changes were made to all versions of the GB driving licence cards and includes:

- The Union Flag has been moved to the top right corner
- The Royal Coat of Arms is included on the front
- The driver number is left justified and in line with the other text
- A secondary image of the licence holder is located on the front
- Colour shifting ink (OVI design) has been reinstated and updated to the back of the licence
- New hologram has been added

The same changes apply to all versions of the Northern Ireland driving licence, excluding the Union Flag and Royal Coat of Arms.

The UK started to develop digital driving licences in 2016. In January 2025, the government announced that they were starting to issue digital driving licences. The digital version of the licence will be held within a GOV.UK wallet installed on a mobile phone.

== Driver numbers ==
=== Great Britain ===
Each licence holder in England, Scotland and Wales has a unique driver number, which is 18 characters long. The characters are constructed in the following way:

- 1–5: The first five characters of the surname (padded with 9s if fewer than 5 characters). For surnames beginning with "MAC", they are treated as "MC" for all.
- 6: The decade digit from the year of birth (e.g. for 1987 it would be 8)
- 7–8: The month of birth in two digit format (7th character is incremented by 5 if the driver is female i.e. 51–62 instead of 01–12)
- 9–10: The date within the month of the day of birth in two digit format (i.e. 01–31)
- 11: The year digit from the year of birth (e.g. for 1987 it would be 7)
- 12–13: The first initial of the first and middle name, padded with a 9 if no middle name (e.g. for John Doe Smith JD, for Jane Smith J9)
  - If the associated passport's machine-readable zone doesn't distinguish between surname and given name, the 12th character will also be a 9.
- 14: Arbitrary digit – usually 9, but decremented to differentiate drivers with the first 13 characters in common
- 15–16: Two computer check digits which may be letters.
- 17–18: Two digits representing the licence issue, which increases by 1 for each licence issued. Not used on previous paper licences.

=== Northern Ireland ===
Driver numbers in Northern Ireland differ from those issued to drivers in GB.

Each Northern Ireland licence holder is assigned a unique, 8 digit driving licence number, e.g. 12345678. This number is assigned randomly and in no specific order.

== Brexit ==
The EEA (blue and green)

The UK left the EU on 31 January 2020, starting an 11-month transition period which terminated on 31 December 2020 in accordance with the Brexit withdrawal agreement. EU law continued to apply to the UK during the transition period, and hence UK driving licences were valid in the EEA and vice versa until 31 December 2020. UK licence holders living in the EU were advised to exchange their UK driving licence for a local one before the transition period ended. The EU flag was removed from UK driving licences when the transition period ended.

From 1 January 2021, with some exceptions, UK licence holders can use their driving licence when visiting EEA countries. International Driving Permits might be needed in some cases, and depending on which convention the country in question has ratified, a 1968 Vienna Convention on Road Traffic IDP might be required in some countries, and a 1949 Geneva Convention on Road Traffic IDP in others (in practice, only Spain, Cyprus and Malta). However, none of the EEA countries currently require IDPs for visitors staying shorter than 12 months. EEA countries are no longer obligated to recognise or exchange UK licences if the holder moves to an EEA country, except if the UK has agreed a bilateral agreement with the country.

European driving licences are recognised by the UK if the driving test was passed in an EU/EEA country, and can be used both if the holder is visiting or residing in the country. They can also be exchanged for a UK (both GB and NI) licence.

== Driving licence categories ==
=== Current categories ===
This is a list of the categories that might be found on a driving licence in the United Kingdom.

Category	Vehicle type	Minimum age	Notes (Note: MAM = Maximum authorised mass)
AM	Mopeds	16	2-wheeled or 3-wheeled vehicles with a maximum design speed of over 15.5 mph (25 km/h) but not more than 28 mph (45 km/h). This category also includes light quadricycles with an unladen mass of not more than 350 kg (not including batteries if it is an electric vehicle) and a maximum design speed of over 15.5 mph (25 km/h) but not more than 28 mph (45 km/h). Electrically assisted pedal cycles (with 2 or 3 wheels) are exempt from the requirement for a licence provided they conform to the EAPC rules, although there is a minimum age of 14. Such vehicles must be equipped with pedals by means of which the vehicle is capable of being propelled. If there are no pedals, then a moped licence is required. (Note: Many users of electrically propelled vehicles believe that they are exempt from licensing if they are solely used on the pavement. As they do not feature pedals for propulsion, they require a licence to drive, though nearly all are illegal on the public highway as they are incapable of passing a vehicle test (no braking system among other reasons).) Electrically assisted scooters are considered to be electrically assisted only if they conform to certain additional EAPC rules, otherwise a licence is required.
P	Mopeds	16	Motor vehicles with fewer than 4 wheels with a maximum design speed of over 28 mph (45 km/h) but not more than 31 mph (50 km/h). The vehicle's engine size must not be more than 50cc if powered by an internal combustion engine.
Q	Mopeds	16	Motor vehicles with fewer than 4 wheels which, if propelled by an internal combustion engine, have a cylinder capacity not exceeding 50 cc and, if not equipped with pedals by means of which the vehicle is capable of being propelled, have a maximum design speed not exceeding 15.5 mph (25 km/h).
A1	Motorcycles	17	Light motorbicycles with an engine size up to 125 cc, a power output of up to 11 kW (14.75 hp), and a power to weight ratio not more than 0.1 kW/kg (136.2 hp/ton). This category also includes motor tricycles with power output up to 15 kW (20.1 hp). A practical training without exam is needed for B licence holders (Compulsory Basic Training).
A2	Motorcycles	19	Motorbicycles in category A1, as well as motorbicycles with a power output up to 35 kW (46.9 hp) and power to weight ratio not more than 0.2 kW/kg (272.5 hp/ton). The motorcycle must also not be derived from a vehicle of more than double its power.
A	Motorcycles	24 (Note: Age 24 or 2 years from date of A2 test pass.)	Motorcycles in categories A1 and A2, as well as motorcycles with a power output more than 35 kW (46.9 hp) or a power to weight ratio more than 0.2 kW/kg (272.5 hp/ton) and motor tricycles with a power output more than 15 kW (20.1 hp). B licence holders who are at least 21 years of age are allowed to drive motor tricycles, including three-wheeled motorcycles with a power exceeding 15 kilowatts (20 hp).
B1	Light vehicles and quadricycles	17 (Note: At age 16, a licence may be issued if the licensee is in receipt of the higher rate of the mobility component of DLA, or the higher rate of the mobility part of PIP. However, if the rate is withdrawn, the normal minimum age for driving a car (17 years) applies.)	Motor vehicles with 4 wheels up to 400 kg unladen, or 550 kg if they are designed for carrying goods.
B	Cars	17 (Note: At age 16, a licence may be issued if the licensee is in receipt of the higher rate of the mobility component of DLA, or the higher rate of the mobility part of PIP. However, if the rate is withdrawn, the normal minimum age for driving a car (17 years) applies.)	Full licence obtained before 1 January 1997: A vehicle and trailer combination up to 8,250 kg MAM.; A minibus with a trailer over 750 kg MAM.; Full licence obtained on or after 1 January 1997: Vehicles up to 3,500 kg MAM with up to eight passenger seats (with a trailer up to 750 kg). Also covers heavier trailers if the total MAM of the vehicle and trailer is not more than 3,500 kg.; Vehicle and Trailer combinations up to 3,500kg MAM with eight passenger seats; Motor tricycles with a power output higher than 15 kW if driver is over 21 years old.; Physically disabled drivers with provisional category B entitlement will also have provisional entitlement to ride category A1 or A motor tricycles. Able-bodied drivers can no longer ride motor tricycles with a provisional category B licence.
B auto	Cars	17	Same as Category B, but only for vehicles with automatic transmissions. Designated with code 78 or 106.
BE	Cars	17 (Note: If the driver has passed their category B or B automatic test before 1 January 1997, their licence will already show C1, C1E (8.25 tonnes), D1, D1E (not for hire or reward) as entitlement flowing from the category B.)	A vehicle with a MAM of 3,500 kg with a trailer. The size of the trailer depends on the BE 'valid from' date shown on the licence. If the date is before 19 January 2013, the vehicle can tow any size trailer. If the date is on or after 19 January 2013, the vehicle can tow a trailer with a MAM of up to 3,500 kg. From 15 November 2021, BE will be granted to all category B licence holders. No category BE tests will take place after 20 September 2021.
C1	Medium-sized vehicles	18 (Note: Age 17 if the driver is a member of the armed services)	Vehicles between 3,500 and 7,500 kg MAM (with a trailer up to 750 kg).
C1E	Medium-sized vehicles	21 (Note: Age 17 if the driver is a member of the armed services; Age 18 if they received their driving licence before 10 September 2009 and the weight of the vehicle and trailer together is under 7,500 kg; Age 18 under certain other circumstances)	C1 category vehicles with a trailer over 750 kg. The combined MAM of both cannot exceed 12,000 kg.
C	Large vehicles	18 (Note: Age 17 if the driver is a member of the armed services; Age 18 under certain other circumstances)	Vehicles over 7,500 kg (with a trailer up to 750 kg MAM<).
CE	Large vehicles	18	Category C vehicles with a trailer over 750 kg.
D1	Minibuses	21 (Note: Age 17 if the driver is a member of the armed services; Age 18 having passed a passenger carrying vehicle (PCV) test before 10 September 2008 and driving under an authorised operator's licence (O-licence), or minibus permit, or community bus permit and under certain conditions; Age 18 under certain other circumstances; Age 20 after passing a PCV driving test and Driver Certificate of Professional Competence (DCPC) initial qualification)	Vehicles with no more than 16 passenger seats, a maximum length of 8 metres, and a trailer up to 750 kg. See also Category B.
D1E	Minibuses	18	D1 category vehicles with a trailer over 750 kg MAM. The combined MAM of both cannot exceed 12,000 kg.
D	Buses	18	Any bus with more than 8 passenger seats (with a trailer up to 750 kg MAM).
DE	Buses	18	D category vehicles with a trailer over 750 kg.
F	Agricultural tractor	16	Maximum weight with trailer = 24 390 kg. Age 16 for tractors less than 2.45m wide. It must only pull trailers less than 2.45 m (96 in) wide with two wheels, or four close-coupled.
G	Road roller	18 (Note: Age 17 for small road-rollers with metal or hard rollers. They must not be steam powered, weigh more than 11.69 tonnes or be made for carrying loads)	
H	Tracked vehicles	18 (Note: Age 17 if the MAM of the tracked vehicle does not exceed 3,500 kg)	
K	Mowing machine or pedestrian-controlled vehicle	16	
L	Electrically propelled vehicle	17	Category now deprecated – tests no longer available (since 2001) for this category. Vehicles now classified by the appropriate group above. (Note: Nevertheless, the category still appears on new licences)
M	Trolley vehicles		Trolley vehicles used for the carriage of passengers with more than 16 seats in addition to the driver’s seat. New licences in this category cannot be obtained.
N	Exempt from duty	Normally as per group if not exempt	Category now deprecated (since 2001). This category was reserved for vehicles driven for a government department. Neither the issue of the licence nor the testing were carried out by the normal licensing authorities. Each department issued the licence to drive (which was similar in appearance to the pre-1973 dark red licence except that it was light blue in colour). This separate licence was proof that the driver had the proper permission to drive an official vehicle (which was neither insured nor taxed and had no MOT). A prerequisite to passing a driving test (and being granted the licence) for this category was that the driver held a normal full licence appropriate for the type of vehicle being driven (military use excepted). The minimum ages for driving were the same as for the normal licence, except that two types of vehicle (motor-cycles and cars displaying military number plates) could be driven at 16 years of age by a serving member (not a civilian employee) on behalf of one of the armed services. The category was abandoned because all government departments now hire or lease their vehicles from regular suppliers. The armed services also lease standard civilian-supplied vehicles, with only specialist military vehicles being 'owned' by the Crown.

=== Obsolete goods classes ===
Although the category system was changed over 25 years ago (1 January 1997), the freight industry and driver recruitment agencies still predominantly use the obsolete class numbers for the entitlement of HGV drivers.

The two systems are not exactly compatible, so the descriptions given are only a guideline.

- Class 1: any goods vehicle over 7½ long tons (7,620 kg or 16,800 lb) with any trailer.
- Class 2: any rigid goods vehicle over 7½ long tons.
- Class 3: any rigid goods vehicle over 7½ long tons with no more than two axles.

== Points and endorsements ==
The UK uses a cumulative points system for driving offences. Points are added for driving offences by law courts or where the driver accepts a fixed penalty in lieu of prosecution, and the licence is endorsed accordingly. This also significantly increases insurance premiums as a driver with penalty points is considered a much higher risk to other road users. A UK driving licence may be endorsed for various offences, not only for those committed while driving or in charge of a vehicle. If the individual committing the offence does not hold a valid driving licence the endorsements may be put by until a licence is held. Since the end of the counterpart system in 2015, endorsements on GB licences are kept on a computer database only.

Most endorsements remain valid for four years; some, such as for driving when unfit through alcohol or drugs, are recorded on the licence for 11 years because more severe penalties apply to those convicted twice within 10 years of drink or drug driving offences.

Twelve points on the licence within three years makes the driver liable to disqualification, usually for six months, under the "totting-up" procedure; however, this is not automatic and must be decided on by a court of law. Endorsements remain on the licence for one year longer than their validity (three or ten years) because a court can consider points awarded even though they are not valid for 'totting up'.

== Driving licence codes ==
Certain codes are included on driving licences to indicate restrictions on use. These codes are listed on the back of the card under the column headed "12. Codes" and are listed for each category that is licensed.

As long as the UK remained within the EU, the codes 1–99 were the same as in the rest of the EU, harmonized by Directive 2006/126/EC.

The codes and their meanings are as follows:

- 01 – eyesight correction
- 02 – hearing/communication aid
- 10 – modified transmission
- 15 – modified clutch
- 20 – modified braking systems
- 25 – modified accelerator systems
- 30 – combined braking and accelerator systems (licences issued before 28 November 2016)
- 31 – pedal adaptations and pedal safeguards
- 32 – combined service brake and accelerator systems
- 33 – combined service brake, accelerator and steering systems
- 35 – modified control layouts
- 40 – modified steering
- 42 – modified rear-view mirror(s)
- 43 – modified driving seats
- 44 – modifications to motorcycles
- 44 (1) – single operated brake
- 44 (2) – (adjusted) hand-operated brake (front wheel)
- 44 (3) – (adjusted) foot-operated brake (back wheel)
- 44 (4) – (adjusted) accelerator handle
- 44 (5) – (adjusted) manual transmission and manual clutch
- 44 (6) – (adjusted) rear-view mirror(s)
- 44 (7) – (adjusted) commands (direction indicators, braking light, etc.)
- 44 (8) – seat height allowing the driver, in sitting position, to have 2 feet on the road at the same time
- 45 – motorcycles only with sidecar
- 46 – tricycles only (for licences issued before 29 June 2014)
- 70 – exchange of licence
- 71 – duplicate of licence
- 78 – restricted to vehicles with automatic transmission
- 79 – restricted to vehicles in conformity with the specifications stated in brackets on the licence
- 79.02 – restricted to category AM vehicles of the 3-wheel or light quadricycle type
- 79.03 – restricted to tricycles
- 96 – allowed to drive a vehicle and trailer where the trailer weighs at least 750 kg, and the combined weight of the vehicle and trailer is between 3,500 kg and 4,250 kg
- 97 – not allowed to drive category C1 vehicles which are required to have a tachograph fitted
- 101 – not for hire or reward (that is, not to make a profit)
- 102 – drawbar trailers only
- 103 – subject to certificate of competence
- 105 – vehicle not more than 5.5 metres long
- 106 – restricted to vehicles with automatic transmissions
- 107 – not more than 8,250 kilogrammes
- 108 – subject to minimum age requirements
- 110 – limited to transporting persons with restricted mobility
- 111 – limited to 16 passenger seats
- 113 – limited to 16 passenger seats except for automatics
- 114 – with any special controls required for safe driving
- 115 – organ donor
- 118 – start date is for earliest entitlement
- 119 – weight limit(s) for vehicle do(es) not apply
- 121 – restricted to conditions specified in the Secretary of State's notice
- 122 – valid on successful completion: Basic Moped Training Course
- 125 – tricycles only (for licences issued before 29 June 2014)

== Use as proof of identity ==
Identity cards for UK nationals were introduced in 2009 on a voluntary basis, but were cancelled in 2010 and all existing cards were invalidated by 2011. Therefore, full driving licences, particularly the photocard driving licence introduced in 1998, along with passports, are the documents most widely used to prove identity in the United Kingdom. The paper driving licence is generally not accepted as proof of ID, due to their lack of a photo; It is also not acceptable proof of Voter ID, where some types of bus pass will suffice instead. In day-to-day life there is no legal requirement to carry identification, even while driving, and most authorities do not arbitrarily ask for identification from individuals. Although not all are eligible for one, provisional driving licences are accepted as proof of identity by some organisations, but they are not universally acceptable.

== Exchange agreements ==
The UK has an exchange agreement with 22 'designated' countries/regions which allows the holder of a foreign driving licence who is deemed to be resident in the UK to exchange it for a British licence. Initially, there were 18 such countries/regions, but an additional four, namely Taiwan, the United Arab Emirates, Ukraine and the Republic of North Macedonia, were added from 20 May 2021. To do such licence exchange, the holder must send the licence, a translation thereof if required, an application form and a fee to the DVLA or DVA (for Northern Ireland).

- The countries/regions are: Andorra, Australia, Barbados, British Virgin Islands, Canada, Cayman Islands, Falkland Islands, Faroe Islands, Gibraltar, Hong Kong, Japan, Monaco, New Zealand, Republic of Korea, Republic of North Macedonia, Singapore, South Africa, Switzerland, Taiwan, Ukraine, United Arab Emirates, and Zimbabwe

=== Post-Brexit arrangements ===
The UK and Ireland have signed a bilateral agreement, allowing those holding a UK driving licence and living in Ireland to continue to be able to swap it for an Irish licence after the Brexit transition period ended on 31 December 2020.

The UK and Norway have agreed to continue existing arrangements on mutual recognition of driving licences after Brexit.

EU and EEA licences can be used in the UK.

== See also ==
- European driving licence
- British passport
- Vehicle registration plates of the United Kingdom
