= Pass Plus =

Pass Plus logo.

Pass Plus Scheme commonly referred to as Pass Plus is a scheme run in the United Kingdom aimed at new drivers who have recently passed the standard driving test, which helps to give drivers the confidence to drive on their own and to increase experience on the road.

== Introduction and purpose ==
Pass plus is an optional course introduced by DVSA and is considered the best way to give additional driving experience to a qualified learner by an ADI (Approved Driving Instructor) that has been Pass Plus registered.

The main aim of this course is to impart valuable knowledge to drivers who have recently passed the practical driving test, and who want to learn new skills and techniques, improve their anticipation and alertness and learn how to reduce accidents. This course is also sometimes considered as a more advanced course for the new drivers, who have recently completed the studies and haven't faced some situations during their driving lessons. The course is carried out by an approved driving instructor (ADI), who is qualified to teach the course.

== Content ==
Pass Plus comprises six modules, each covering a different aspect of driving. These modules are:

- Town driving
- All-weather driving
- Driving out of town
- Night driving
- Driving on dual carriageways
- Driving on motorways

Some of the aspects may be covered in theory only, such as weather and night driving which require conditions that may be hard to replicate especially in the summer, or motorway driving if there is no motorway nearby. However, this is only done when a practical training session is not possible.

The scheme takes a minimum of six hours to complete. The practical assessment is more lenient than that used in the standard driving test, and adherence to many rules that would otherwise constitute a major mistake in the main practical exam (such as parking at an angle) does not apply. It is only required that one is able to drive safely and legally.

There is no examination at the end of the Pass Plus course; rather, a certificate is awarded once the instructor is satisfied with the candidate's competence.

Each module must be completed to an achieved or exceeded standard, in order to pass:

Achieved: successfully reached the driving standard required for each of the competencies.

Exceeded: exceeded the driving standard required for each of the competencies.

== Insurance ==
Many insurance companies offer cheaper car insurance to drivers who have completed the Pass Plus scheme.

== See also ==
- United Kingdom driving test
