= Trading fund =

Government Trading Funds Act 1973 (Note: Section 8.)
- Act of Parliament
- Parliament of the United Kingdom
- Long title: An Act to enable certain services of the Crown to be financed by means of trading funds established in pursuance of orders made by the responsible Minister with Treasury concurrence; to make consequential provision (in the event of a trading fund being established for the Mint) as to sums received by, or due from, the Treasury in respect of the coinage; and to amend the Coinage Act 1971 in respect of the establishment and operations of the Mint.
- Citation: 1973 c. 63
- Territorial extent: United Kingdom

Dates
- Royal assent: 25 October 1973
- Commencement: 25 October 1973 (Note: The Acts of Parliament (Commencement) Act 1793.)
Other legislation
| Amends | Coinage Act 1971 |
| Amended by | Transfer of Functions (Minister for the Civil Service and Treasury) Order 1981; Government Trading Act 1990; Finance Act 1991; Finance Act 1993; Government Resources and Accounts Act 2000; Finance Act 2001 |

Status: Amended

Text of statute as originally enacted

Text of the Government Trading Funds Act 1973 as in force today (including any amendments) within the United Kingdom, from legislation.gov.uk.

Government Trading Act 1990 (Note: Section 5(1).)
- Act of Parliament
- Parliament of the United Kingdom
- Long title: An Act to amend the Government Trading Funds Act 1973 and section 5 of the Exchequer and Audit Departments Act 1921 and to repeal the Borrowing (Control and Guarantees) Act 1946.
- Citation: 1990 c. 30
- Territorial extent: England and Wales; Scotland; Northern Ireland (except section 4).; (Note: Section 5(5).)

Dates
- Royal assent: 26 July 1990
- Commencement: 26 July 1990 (except section 4); 11 February 1991 (section 4).; (Note: Section 4(3). The Government Trading Act 1990 (Appointed Day) Order 1991 (SI 1991/132).)
Other legislation
| Amends | Exchequer and Audit Departments Act 1866; Exchequer and Audit Departments Act 1921; Civil Evidence Act 1968; Transport Act 1968; Government Trading Funds Act 1973; Solicitors Act 1974; Theatres Trust Act 1976; Insurance Brokers (Registration) Act 1977 |
| Repeals/revokes | Borrowing (Control and Guarantees) Act 1946 |

Status: Current legislation

Text of statute as originally enacted

Text of the Government Trading Act 1990 as in force today (including any amendments) within the United Kingdom, from legislation.gov.uk.

A trading fund is an executive agency, government department, or often simply a part of a department that enables the department to handle its own revenues and expenses separately from overall government finances and more like a business, as opposed to having to obtain funding from the government's legislature and feeding income back into its treasury. A Hong Kong parliamentary study of trading funds in the UK and Hong Kong describes their nature and purpose as follows:

A trading fund is a financial and accounting framework established by law to enable a government department, or part of a department, to adopt certain accounting and management practices common in the private sector. [The fund] operates on a self-financing basis and does not need to regularly seek funding from the legislature to finance its daily operations after its establishment... the intention [is that such] an institutional change would provide the appropriate flexibility in resource management and nurture a new working culture to improve services in terms of both quality and cost-effectiveness.

Each country has its own specific laws and regulations controlling the establishment and use of trading funds. Trading funds in the UK were initially established through the Government Trading Funds Act 1973 (c. 63), and modified by the Government Trading Act 1990 (c. 30), along with other modifications through finance legislation. In 1993, Hong Kong followed suit with its Trading Funds Ordinance of that year. Establishment and operation of a Hong Kong trading fund is subject to decisions made by the Legislative Council on the recommendation of the Financial Secretary.

The significance of a UK trading fund is that it has standing authority under the 1973 Act to use its receipts to meet its expenses or outgoings. Some trading funds have, as their main function, the collection and supply of information to both public and private sectors; others do not. Also in the UK, a trading fund can only be established with the agreement of HM Treasury. To establish a fund, more than 50% of the trading fund's revenue will consist of receipts for goods and services provided by the department, and where the responsible minister and the Treasury are satisfied that the setting up of the trading fund will lead to "improved efficiency and effectiveness in management of operations".

== List of trading funds ==
Date of establishment as trading fund is shown:

=== United Kingdom ===
==== Current ====
- Driver & Vehicle Agency (DVA) – 1 April 2007 (Northern Ireland; owned by the Northern Ireland Executive)
- FCDO Services – 1 April 2008
- Government Commercial Agency – 1 April 1991 (first known as the Buying Agency, then OGCbuying.solutions, then Buying Solutions, then the Government Procurement Service, then the Crown Commercial Service)
- Intellectual Property Office – 1 October 1991 (first known as the Patent Office)
- Meteorological Office – 1 April 1996
- Queen Elizabeth II Centre – 1 April 1997
- Registers of Scotland – 1 April 1996 (owned by the Scottish Government)
- Royal Mint – 1 April 1975 (became holding entity of Royal Mint Ltd on 31 December 2009)
- United Kingdom Atomic Energy Authority (UKAEA) – 1 April 1986 (required to act and account as a trading fund)
- United Kingdom Hydrographic Office (UKHO) – 1 April 1996

==== Previous ====
- Companies House – 1 October 1991 (trading fund status removed on 1 April 2020)
- Defence Science and Technology Laboratory (Dstl) – 1 July 2001 (trading fund status removed on 1 April 2017)
- Driver and Vehicle Licensing Agency (DVLA) – 1 April 2004 (trading fund status removed on 1 April 2011)
- Driver and Vehicle Standards Agency (DVSA) – 1 April 2015 (trading fund status removed on 1 April 2021)
- HM Land Registry – 1 April 1993 (trading fund status removed on 1 April 2020)
- Medicines and Healthcare products Regulatory Agency (MHRA) – 1 April 2003 (trading fund status removed on 1 April 2022)

==== Defunct ====
- Army Base Repair Organisation (ABRO) – 1 April 2002 (merged with DARA to form DSG on 1 April 2008)
- Central Office of Information (COI) – 1 April 1991 (abolished in March 2012)
- Chessington Computer Centre – 1 April 1993 (privatised in July 1996)
- Crown Suppliers – 1 April 1976 (first known as the Supplies Division of the Property Services Agency and abolished in March 1991)
- Defence Aviation Repair Agency (DARA) – 1 April 2001 (merged with ABRO to form DSG on 1 April 2008)
- Defence Evaluation and Research Agency (DERA) – 1 April 1995 (split into Dstl and Qinetiq on 1 July 2001)
- Defence Research Agency (DRA) – 1 April 1993 (became part of DERA on 1 April 1995)
- Defence Support Group (DSG) – 1 April 2008 (privatised in April 2015)
- Driver and Vehicle Testing Agency (DVTA) – 1 April 1996 (merged with Driver and Vehicle Licensing Northern Ireland to form DVA on 1 April 2007)
- Driving Standards Agency (DSA) – 1 April 1997 (merged with VOSA to form the DVSA on 1 April 2015)
- Fire Service College (FSC) – 1 April 1992 (privatised in February 2013)
- Forensic Science Service (FSS) – 1 April 1999 (abolished in March 2012)
- HM Stationery Office (HMSO) – 1 April 1980 (privatised as The Stationery Office in September 1996)
- Medicines Control Agency (MCA) – 1 April 1993 (merged with Medical Devices Agency to form MHRA on 1 April 2003)
- NHS Estates – 1 April 1999 (abolished in September 2005)
- Ordnance Survey (OS) – 1 April 1999 (became a government-owned company on 1 April 2015)
- Royal Ordnance Factories (ROFs) – 1 July 1974 (privatised as Royal Ordnance in April 1987)
- Vehicle and Operator Services Agency (VOSA) – 1 April 2003 (merged with the DSA to form the DVSA on 1 April 2015)
- Vehicle Inspectorate – 1 April 1991 (merged with Traffic Area Network to form VOSA on 1 April 2003)

=== Hong Kong ===
- Companies Registry – 1 August 1993
- Electrical and Mechanical Services – 1 August 1996
- Hongkong Post – 1 August 1995
- Land Registry – 1 August 1993
- Office of the Telecommunications Authority (OFTA) – 1 June 1995
- Sewage Services – 11 March 1994 (trading fund status removed on 31 March 1998)
