= United Kingdom driving test =

Test of driving competence

The United Kingdom driving test is a test of competence that UK residents take in order to obtain a full Great Britain or Northern Ireland (car) driving licence or to add additional full entitlements to an existing one. Tests vary depending on the class of vehicle to be driven. In Great Britain it is administered by the Driver and Vehicle Standards Agency (DVSA) and in Northern Ireland by the Driver & Vehicle Agency (DVA).

The minimum age at which one can take a UK driving test is currently 16 for mopeds and 17 for cars (16 for those on the higher/enhanced rate of the mobility component of Disability Living Allowance or Personal Independence Payment). There is no upper age limit. In addition to a driving licence, a Compulsory Basic Training (CBT) certificate may be required before a moped or motorcycle is ridden.

Around 1.6 million people sit the practical car test each year, with a pass rate of around 43%. The theory test has a pass rate of around 50%. To become a category B (car) licence holder, candidates pay £23 for the theory test and £62 (£65 in Northern Ireland) for the practical driving test.

== History ==
UK driving licences were introduced by the Motor Car Act 1903 but no test was required. The intention was purely to identify vehicles and their drivers. The Road Traffic Act 1930 introduced age restrictions and a test for disabled drivers; this was the first formal driving test in the UK. These licences were only valid for one year from the date of issue. Legislation for compulsory testing was introduced for all new drivers with the Road Traffic Act 1934. The test was initially voluntary to avoid a rush of candidates until 1 June 1935 when all people who had started to drive on or after 1 April 1934 needed to have passed the test.

Testing was suspended during World War II, and was suspended again during the Suez Crisis in 1956 to allow examiners to help to administer petrol rations. During the Coronavirus pandemic, testing was also suspended; in England between March and July 2020 and January and April 2021; in Wales, between March and August 2020 and January and April 2021; in Scotland, between March 2020 and May 2021; and in Northern Ireland between March 2020 and April 2021. Key workers were still allowed to take tests if they had submitted the correct paperwork.

The driving theory test was introduced in July 1996 as a written examination, which was updated to computerised format in 2000. The hazard perception segment of the theory test was introduced in November 2002. In January 2015, new CGI clips replaced the real-life video clips in the Hazard Perception Test.

== Test requirements ==
Drivers wishing to gain a category B (car) licence need to pass two separate tests. First, the theory test must be passed. The candidate then has two years to pass their practical test before their theory test certificate expires and they have to take the theory again. Upon passing the practical test, drivers are given a pass certificate (acting as a temporary licence) and immediately become category B licence holders.

=== Theory ===
The theory test is made up of two parts, both of which differ according to the type of vehicle licence the candidate is pursuing:

- Multiple-choice test
- Hazard perception test

Both parts must be passed in order to obtain a theory test pass certificate. This enables the candidate to book a practical driving test. Candidates have two years from the date that they passed the first part of their theory test to take their practical test, or they will have to pass both parts of the theory test once again before they can book a practical test.

==== Multiple-choice test ====
This part of the theory test is performed on a computer system. The test has 50 multiple choice questions and the candidate must answer at least 43 (86%) of them correctly to pass. All questions are randomly selected from a bank of just under one thousand on a selection of topics.

The test lasts for 57 minutes, although candidates with certain special needs can apply for more time. All 50 questions must be answered. The test allows 15 minutes practice time at the start of the exam to get used to answering the questions and how to use the system. To answer a question the candidate simply touches their choice of answer from the listed answers on the computer screen. If a mistake is made the candidate can deselect a choice and reselect a different option. The candidate is allowed to go back to a question at any time and can also flag questions they are unsure of in order to find and return to it quickly and easily later.

For lorry and bus drivers, 100 questions are asked over a 115-minute period, and 85 out of 100 must be answered correctly to pass.

Prior to 3 September 2007, the car and motorcycle multiple-choice tests comprised 35 questions, with a pass mark of 30 within a 40-minute time limit.

==== Hazard perception ====
Candidates watch fourteen one-minute clips (nineteen clips for lorry and bus candidates) filmed from the perspective of a car driver or motorcyclist and have to indicate, usually by clicking a mouse button or touching the screen, when they observe a developing hazard.

=== Practical ===
Unless one is converting a foreign licence, it is necessary to have passed both components of the theory test before sitting this exam. Passing the practical test entitles one to hold a full UK driving licence.

The test candidate must produce their provisional licence for the examiner before the test starts.

The practical car test can be taken in either a manual or an automatic car; if the test is passed in an automatic car, then the full licence granted will be restricted to automatic cars only.

The motorcycle practical test is split into two separate modules: the off-road module and the on-road module. To get a full motorcycle licence, the candidate needs to pass both modules.

DVSA Form DL25C: Driving Test Report issued NG5 to candidates by examiners

==== Format ====
The practical car test is taken on the road, with a professionally trained DVSA examiner directing the candidate around a pre-determined route. The examiner marks the candidate for driving faults, serious faults, and dangerous faults. A candidate will fail the test if they make any serious or dangerous faults, or accumulates more than fifteen driving faults. If a candidate accumulates several driving faults in the same category, the examiner may consider the fault habitual and mark a serious fault in that category. Committing a dangerous fault may result in the immediate termination of the test, especially if committed early on, though this is left to the judgement of the examiner. The test usually lasts 38 to 40 minutes in a standard test, or approximately 70 minutes when the candidate is taking an extended test after having had their licence revoked. In October 2019 the traditional paper marking sheet was replaced by an iPad. Instead of being handed a paper copy of the examiner's report, candidates receive a summary of their performance via email.

==== Eyesight test ====
Before getting to the car, the examiner will ask the candidate to read a car's number plate at a distance. The distance required is 20.5 metres (67 ft) for an old-style plate (A123 ABC) and 20 metres (66 ft) for a new style plate (AB51 ABC). If the candidate needs corrective lenses to do this, then they must be worn during the test. If the candidate fails to read the first number plate correctly, then the examiner asks the candidate to read a second number plate. If the candidate cannot correctly read the second number plate, they will be taken further forward for one more attempt. If the number plate cannot be read from here, then the examiner must use a tape measure to measure the correct distance between the candidate and a third number plate. If the candidate cannot read the third number plate, then the candidate is deemed to have failed and the test will not continue. The DVLA will be informed and the candidate's provisional licence will be revoked.

The candidate will have to reapply for a provisional driving licence and attend a test centre to have an eyesight check before they are allowed to rebook a test. If successful, the DVSA standard eyesight test must still be completed at the candidate's next practical driving test.

==== Vehicle safety questions ====
The "Show me tell me" changed on 4 December 2017. The examiner will ask the candidate one "tell me" question (where they explain how they would carry out a safety task) at the start of the test and before the candidate starts driving. The new "show me" element is to allow the candidate to demonstrate how to carry out a safety task while driving. These are phrased in the form "Show me..." and "Tell me...".

If the candidate answers one or both of the "show me" and "tell me" questions incorrectly, one driving fault is recorded.

==== Emergency (controlled) stop ====
The emergency stop determines the ability of the candidate to stop the vehicle as quickly and safely as possible, as if a sudden and unexpected hazard had appeared presenting an imminent danger to life and limb (an example often given here is if a child had suddenly run out into the road, directly in front of the candidate's vehicle).

An emergency stop exercise will be carried out on every extended test, and one in seven normal tests. While this is referred to on the DL25 as a "controlled stop", this can also refer to stopping the vehicle in a safe place under normal conditions, which would be very different from an emergency stop. Hence, examiners will always use the term "emergency stop" when briefing candidates about the exercise.

The examiner will request the candidate to pull up on the left, and brief them on what is about to happen. The candidate will then be asked to move off and drive normally. The examiner will check carefully all around the car, to determine an emergency stop would be safe, and would then raise their right hand (in a right-hand drive vehicle) and call out "STOP!". The candidate must then stop the vehicle as quickly and safely as possible; this means braking very sharply without checking mirrors first, all while maintaining proper control of the vehicle. While not recommended, stalling a manual car on the emergency stop is common and is not automatically faulted, as long as control of the car is retained. Once the exercise is completed the candidate must also resume driving safely, making all appropriate observations before moving off again.

Faults for this exercise are often given for:

- reacting late (or not at all) to the stop signal
- losing control of the vehicle when stopping, for example locking the wheels and skidding (though this is less likely in modern vehicles due to anti-lock braking systems).
- upon completion of the emergency stop, failure to observe all around the car (including all mirrors and blind spots) before moving off again

==== Manoeuvres ====
One of the most major changes to the GB driving test on 4 December 2017 was in the reversing manoeuvres that candidates are expected to carry out. Turning in the road (the "three-point turn") and reversing left around a corner are no longer assessed, but instructors are still encouraged to cover these skills as they are useful in everyday driving.

The new manoeuvres to be tested are considered to be more relevant for drivers, and combine the skills of reversing with safe parking. There are four manoeuvres, one of which will be tested on every driving test:

- reversing into a bay, and driving forwards out (this must be done in the driving test centre car park, at the very start or end of the test);
- driving forward into a bay, and reversing out (this is usually carried out during the test, in a suitable car park at some point along the test route);
- parallel parking at the side of the road, completing the exercise within two car lengths; and
- pulling up on the right hand side of the road, reversing straight back for about two car lengths, before safely re-joining the flow of traffic.

Manoeuvres involving a parking bay must be completed with all four wheels inside the lines, and those carried out at the roadside must be done without hitting or mounting the kerb at any time.

==== General driving ====
Generally, the candidate must demonstrate an ability to drive in various road and traffic conditions and react appropriately in actual risk situations. The conditions typically encountered on test include driving in urban areas as well as higher speed limit roads where possible; this includes dual carriageways but not motorways. Motorways in Great Britain can only be used by full licence holders, and learner drivers in a dual control vehicle with a licensed instructor in the passenger seat.

The object of the test is to ensure that the candidate is well grounded in the basic principles of safe driving, and is sufficiently practised in them to be able to show, at the time of the test, that they are a competent and considerate driver and are not a source of danger to themselves or to other road users. The drive will include two or three normal stops at (and moving away from) the side of the road on level roads as well as up a hill, in addition to a demonstration of moving away at an angle from behind a stationary vehicle.

The regulations state that the on-road driving time must be no less than 28–30 minutes. If at any point during the test, the examiner has to intervene verbally or physically (including with dual controls), this will, in the vast majority of cases, be marked on the test report as a serious or dangerous fault, and result in test failure.

==== Independent driving ====
The length of the independent driving section was also a significant change when the GB driving test changed in December 2017. The independent portion of the practical test is now longer; having been increased from around 10 minutes to approximately 20 minutes. In four out of five tests, candidates are now asked to follow directions given on a satellite navigation (sat-nav) device, with the remaining one in five asked, as before, to follow signs. Sat-navs are not used in tests carried out in Northern Ireland.

This section is included on practical driving tests for the following vehicles or licences:

- Car
- Motorcycle module two
- Large goods vehicle (LGV)
- Approved driving instructor (ADI) driving ability (sometimes called 'part two')
- Taxi

During the independent driving section, candidates have to follow:

- traffic signs to a destination, or
- instructions from a sat-nav (GB only), or
- a series of verbal instructions, or
- a combination of the above.

Candidates are permitted to deviate from the given route if they get lost and they will not receive any faults for this providing they are driving safely: for example, if a candidate is instructed by the sat-nav to proceed straight ahead at a junction but they find themselves in a "left turn only" lane. The correct course of action would be to make a lane change if it is safe to do so without causing risk or inconvenience to others; otherwise stay in the lane and turn left using normal and safe procedure (eg. mirrors, signal, manoeuvre). Once through the junction safely, the candidate can attempt to return to their route. A fault may be given if the candidate was to proceed straight ahead in the left turn lane as this can be dangerous to other road users. When a candidate deviates from the route the examiner may direct them back towards their destination until the candidate is able to resume independent driving. If a SatNav is being used this may automatically recalculate a new route to get them back on course.

If there are poor or obscured traffic signs, the examiner may give the candidate directions until they can see the next traffic sign. Candidates do not need to have a detailed knowledge of the area. If the SatNav gives incorrect directions the examiner will assist the candidate with verbal direction. The SatNav device (if used) is brought by the examiner and they will set it up for the candidate. The DVSA currently issues the TomTom Start 52 to its driving examiners. Some driving instructors will use this exact model during lessons in order to familiarise students with the layout of the device.

If the candidate has special needs, the examiner will be able to make reasonable adjustments. For the independent driving section, this could be asking the candidate which method they prefer: following signs, or a series of directions (a maximum of three).

== Northern Ireland ==
In Northern Ireland, the DVA is responsible for the practical driving test and it is slightly different from that carried out in Great Britain by the DVSA.

There are similarities between the GB and NI test. These are carried out in the same way as detailed above. These Include:

- The Eyesight Test
- Show Me, Tell Me Questions
- Driving Faults (including examiner intervention)
- Test Length (40 minutes)

The independent driving portion of the test will last approximately 30 minutes and, unlike GB, will never make use of a SatNav. All candidates will be required to follow road signs and/or verbal directions given by the examiner. As in GB, if candidates forget directions or make an incorrect turn, they may ask for the instruction to be repeated and, as long as they have driven safely, they will not receive any faults.

The manoeuvres in Northern Ireland are different and may be one of the following:

- Turn in the road
- Reverse to the left (round a corner)
- Reverse bay park
- Parallel park

All candidates will be required to carry out the emergency stop procedure.

NI R plate example

In Northern Ireland, candidates may drive on roads with higher speed limits, but due to speed restrictions imposed on learner drivers, they must not exceed 45 mph (72 km/h) and this will be recorded as a fault for "use of speed" (speeding).

When a candidate has passed the driving test, they must display 'R' plates (Restricted) on the vehicle (similar to L plates) for 1 year after the date they passed. "R drivers" are also restricted to 45 mph (72 km/h). Although limited to 45 mph, they are permitted to drive on motorways.

== COVID-19 changes to the practical driving test (2020–2021) ==
In 2020, as a result of the COVID-19 pandemic in the United Kingdom, practical driving tests were temporarily delayed and a number of changes were bought into force which included:

- Candidates who had a test booked in at the start of the pandemic were given a new date. If the two years between the theory test and practical test had elapsed then the pupil was required to resit the theory and hazard perception test.
- When arriving at the test centre, wearing a face covering was a requirement unless one was medically exempt. However, wearing glasses did not count as a good reason, so pupils who wore glasses were advised to practise during their lessons.
- If a candidate committed a serious or dangerous fault during the test, which meant they failed the test, then the test would end and the examiner would guide the student back to the test centre, in order to minimise the contact together in the vehicle.
- Driving instructors were not allowed to accompany candidates on their driving tests.
- At the end of the test, the examiner gave feedback from outside of the vehicle, and at that point the candidate could ask the instructor to come over to listen if it is safe to do so.

This guidance was formally withdrawn on 19 July 2021.

== See also ==
- Driving test
- Pass Plus
- Eco Driving
- UK road signs
