= Borrowing (Control and Guarantees) Act 1946 =

Act of the Parliament of the United Kingdom

Borrowing (Control and Guarantees) Act 1946 (Note: Section 7.)
- Act of Parliament
- Parliament of the United Kingdom
- Long title: An Act to provide for the regulation of the borrowing and raising of money, the issue of securities, and the circulation of offers of securities for subscription, sale or exchange, to enable the Treasury to guarantee loans in certain circumstances, and for purposes connected with the matters aforesaid.
- Citation: 9 & 10 Geo. 6. c. 58
- Territorial extent: England and Wales; Scotland; Northern Ireland (section 6); (Note: Section 6.)

Dates
- Royal assent: 12 July 1946
- Commencement: 12 July 1946 (Note: The Acts of Parliament (Commencement) Act 1793.)
- Repealed: 11 February 1991 (Note: The Government Trading Act 1990 (Appointed Day) Order 1991 (SI 1991/132).)
Other legislation
Amended by	Statute Law Revision Act 1963; Statute Law (Repeals) Act 1986
Repealed by	Government Trading Act 1990

Status: Repealed

Text of statute as originally enacted

Revised text of statute as amended

The Borrowing (Control and Guarantees) Act 1946 (9 & 10 Geo. 6. c. 58) was an act of the Parliament of the United Kingdom that allowed HM Treasury to directly regulate borrowing within England and Wales and Scotland.

== Provisions ==
The act was given royal assent on 12 July 1946. It made it necessary for all borrowing and raising of capital to be passed through HM Treasury, something first introduced by the Defence (Finance) Regulations 1939. Section 1 of the act allowed the Treasury to make orders regulating a company incorporated in Britain, the circulation of any offer of foreign securities in Britain, and the borrowing of more than £10,000 in a twelve-month period by any person. Section 2 allowed the Treasury to provide up to £50,000,000 each financial year to aid in the reconstruction of industry, countering the first section (which restricted private enterprise) by allowing the Treasury to support it directly.

The Radcliffe Committee found that "it was impossible to resist the broad conclusion that the [act] had no significant impact on the pressure of total demand", and it was repealed by the Government Trading Act 1990.

== Bibliography ==
- "Borrowing (Control and Guarantees) Act, 1946". Modern Law Review. 10 (1). Blackwell Publishing. 1947. ISSN 0026-7961.
- Williamson, Phillip (2004). The British government and the city of London in the twentieth century. Cambridge University Press. ISBN 0-521-82769-8.
