= Driving examiner (United Kingdom) =

Type of British Civil Servant

In the United Kingdom, driving examiners are civil servants employed by the Driver and Vehicle Standards Agency (DVSA) in Great Britain and by the Driver and Vehicle Agency (DVA) in Northern Ireland for the purpose of conducting the practical element of driving tests.

Outside the military, haulage and private bus companies who employ delegated examiners who test their own drivers, driving examiners are the only people who are authorised to conduct driving tests and issue the certificate required for obtaining a full driving licence in the UK. Driving examiners do not conduct the theory tests as these take place in an office environment, supervised by administrative staff.

== Organisation ==
There are over 1,600 driving examiners in the UK, working at over 400 test centres.

Driving examiners may be full or part-time, conducting anything from 35 tests a week (full-time) down to 14 tests a week (the current part-time minimum). Overtime is available when there is demand, which is more or less constant in all but the quietest of locations.

Not counting trainees, there are three job roles associated with the Operational Delivery of Driving Tests - Driving Examiner (DE), Local Driving Test Manager (LDTM) and Operational Delivery Manager (ODM). Test centres are grouped into sectors with each sector headed by a LDTM, with the ODM heading a large geographical area of test centres.

Mark Winn is currently appointed as the Chief Driving Examiner for the whole country, although the Chief Driving Examiner is not the head of the DVSA with several layers of non-examiner management and executive staff additionally employed.

== Vehicles tested ==
All driving examiners start as (only) car examiners, since car tests represent by far and away the highest demand.

The most common additional vehicle tested for is the tractor. Category F testing can be done with a standard licence holder as it is a given entitlement when passing a car test. Large Goods Vehicle testing is a close second due to operational demands. The current motorcycle test involves off-road testing so candidates normally have to go to a purpose built testing centre (this is under review). The DVSA certifies examiners for every vehicle that a licence can be issued, however, so examiners exist to cover everything from the moped to tracked vehicles.

== Special tests ==
Beyond what are known as the "L" tests (ordinary driving tests for any given vehicle), driving examiners also conduct various special tests including the extended driving test for banned drivers to re-qualify, and disability tests for candidates requiring vehicle adaptations. The extended test required for prospective examiners is usually undertaken by LDTM's and very experienced examiners. An ADI standards team, normally consisting of former driving examiners, undertake various tests required for Approved Driving Instructors to qualify as such.

== Recruitment, selection and training ==
The DVSA recruits driving examiners by national campaign as and when it needs more.

A prospective driving examiner must have held a full car licence for more than four years with no more than three penalty points on it at the time of application. If the candidate is successful at the application form stage, he/she will be asked to take an online situational judgement test; if successful here, he/she will be invited for a Role Play Assessment at a regional training centre. If the candidate passes this, he/she will then be invited to take a driving assessment. The driving assessment involves a drive over a specially chosen route of about 20 to 25 miles. It will usually involve both urban and rural areas and will include driving on a dual carriageway and motorway (if within local area). Candidates are expected to drive at a speed consistent with the road and traffic conditions. Assessment drives are graded bronze-silver-gold.

If the candidate passes and if there is a vacant post in a location at which he/she is able to work, then only at this stage will he/she be employed. The new examiner spends one day at the test centre at which he/she will be employed, then four to six weeks at one of the regional training centres, which are located around the country. This used to be within the DVSA's former training and development centre in Cardington. As part of the training course, the candidate is expected to retake the theory and hazard perception tests. These are the same as the 'L' tests but with higher scores needed to pass. After passing the course the candidate will be appointed as a DE and assigned to a test centre. A 6 month probation period then applies wherein the candidate must maintain a certain standard.

== See also ==
- Driver and Vehicle Standards Agency
- United Kingdom driving test
- Public and Commercial Services Union
