= Hazard perception test =

British driving competence test

The hazard perception test is part of the United Kingdom driving test. The test is intended to check a candidate’s ability to detect developing situations that require a motorist to take some action, such as changing speed or direction.

The test was introduced in 2002 and updated in 2015 with computer generated clips replacing the live action videos.

An almost identical test of the same name is used in the Australian state of New South Wales in order to get a provisional P1 licence. Similar tests are also required in the Australian states of Victoria and Western Australia.

== Test description ==
Screenshot of the test with new computer generated graphics

The hazard perception test is administered as part of the theory test and is taken immediately after the multiple-choice questions. Learner drivers can sit the test from the age of 17. Those on the higher rate component of Disability Living Allowance are able to take the test at 16.

For the purposes of the test, a "developing hazard" is something that requires a motorist to change speed and / or direction. This includes cars entering traffic from an adjoining road, pedestrians crossing the road, cyclists entering the motorist’s lane while manoeuvring around a stopped vehicle and a preceding car stopping suddenly.

The test consists of video clips that contain one, or for one of the clips two, hazards. The candidate watches the video clip and, using the mouse, clicks to flag an incident as they see it develop. On the clip with two incidents, the candidate must flag both.

The earlier a candidate notices a developing hazard and make a response, the higher the score. The highest score for each hazard is 5 points.

The test instructions are to respond once to each hazard and warns that multiple clicks will result in a zero score. However, if a candidate flags a hazard as she or he sees it develop but before the scoring period as defined by the test’s designers has opened, zero points will be registered. The government revealed in an FOI request that 299 out of 515 complaints received about the test during 2009-2011 related to scoring.

After completing the test, the candidate receives a paper printout showing grades for both the multiple-choice questions and the hazard perception test. The candidate must pass both tests to continue to the practical test; if either part is failed, both must be taken again. The pass mark for cars is 44 of 75 across 14 video clips, 57 of 75 for approved driving instructors and 67 of 100 for lorry drivers.
