= Lliswerry High School =

- Ysgol Uwchradd Llysweri
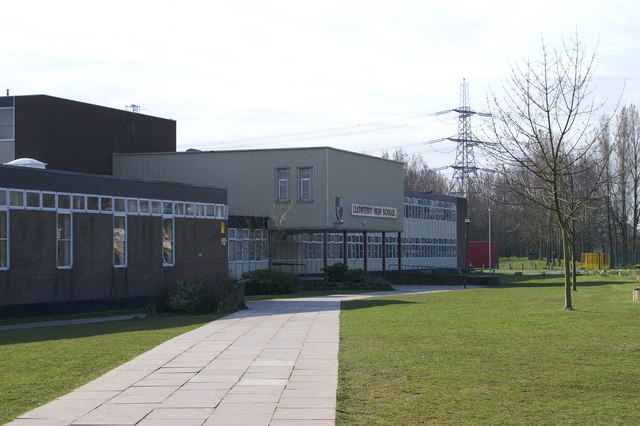

Location
- Nash Road; Newport, NP19 4RP; Wales; 51.5716°N 2.9529°W

Information
- Type: Secondary school
- Motto: Ardua ad Alta (Efforts to high things)
- Local authority: Newport City Council
- Department for Education URN: 401868 Tables
- Head teacher: J Fitzgerald
- Gender: Mixed
- Age range: 11–19
- Enrolment: 780 (1986)
- Student to teacher ratio: 17.2
- Language: English
- Yearbook: 1986
- Website: www.lliswerryhigh.org

Lliswerry High School (Welsh: Ysgol Uwchradd Llysweri) is a secondary school in Newport, Wales.
