= Approved Driving Instructor =

Approved Driving Instructor (or ADI) is a UK term for a trainer of car driving who has been tested and registered by the Driver and Vehicle Standards Agency (DVSA). UK law requires driving instructors to be qualified before they can charge for their services.

Free tuition or supervision may however be given by any individual over the age of 21 who has held and continues to hold a full licence in the same class of vehicle as that being used for at least 3 years. The UK has no law requiring the compulsory use of an Approved Driving Instructor but it is against the law for someone to charge a fee for driving tuition at any level, if they are not an Approved Driving Instructor.

== Register of Approved Driving Instructors ==
To be entered on the Register of Approved Driving Instructors one must:

- Hold a full UK or European Union (EU/European Economic Area) (EEA) unrestricted car driving license
- Have held it for a total of at least four out of the past six years prior to entering the Register after qualifying
- Not have been disqualified from driving at any time in the four years prior to being entered in the Register
- Be a "fit and proper" person; all convictions are taken into account when entering your name on the register, and enhanced level criminal record check is required
- Pass two qualifying practical examinations within two years of passing the theory examination
- Apply for registration within 12 months of passing the final part of the examination.

== Qualifying ==
If the application to start the qualifying process and join the Register as a Potential Driving Instructor is successful, they will need to prepare for the qualifying examination.

The qualifying examination is in three parts:

- theory (part one) - a multiple choice section and a video-based hazard perception section
- driving ability (part two) - an eyesight test followed by a practical test of driving technique
- instructional ability (part three) - a practical test of one's ability to instruct

The candidate must pass all three parts of the examination in this order and must complete the whole examination within two years of passing the theory test (part one).

=== Theory (part one) ===
The theory test is the first of three tests they will need to pass before they can register as an ADI. It is made up of two elements:

- a set of multiple choice questions
- a hazard perception test

They will need to pass both elements of the theory test in the same sitting to get an overall pass result. The overall pass mark for the multiple choice part of the test is 85 per cent - i.e., 85 out of 100 questions answered correctly. However, they must reach a minimum mark of 80 per cent - 20 correct questions out of 25 - in each of the four categories:

- road procedure
- traffic signs and signals, car control, pedestrians and mechanical knowledge
- driving test, disabilities, and the law
- publications and instructional techniques

This means it's possible for candidates to get an overall mark of 85 per cent or higher, but still fail the exercise because they did not gain at least of 80 per cent in any one - or more - of the four categories.

For the hazard perception test, the pass mark is 57 out of a possible 75.

=== Driving ability (part two) ===
Part two of the qualifying test for potential driving instructors is a practical assessment of their driving ability. It involves separate assessments of eyesight, and driving technique. Both parts of the test must be passed at the same attempt. To pass the test, they must drive to a high standard of competence, demonstrating a well-planned, positive, progressive drive, sticking to - and reaching - national speed limits when safe and where possible. During the test, prospective instructors are allowed to make a maximum of six driving faults. Seven or more faults mean will result in a fail. One or more serious or dangerous faults will also result in oneself failing the test.

=== Instructional ability (part three) ===
The third part of the ADI examination assesses:

- the quality of one's instruction
- one's ability to pass one's knowledge on to pupils

The test is in two parts - each of which lasts about half an hour. The candidate will be asked to show their knowledge and ability by giving practical instruction to the examiner, who will play the role of a pupil.

The examiner will play two of the following roles:

- a beginner or partly trained pupil
- a pupil who is about test standard
- a qualified driver taking further development training

The ADI Part 3 test is Marked between 0 and 51 points

- Grade A: Very Good (43 - 51)
- Grade B: Satisfactory (31 - 42)
- Grade C: Fail (0 - 30)

To pass, the candidates must achieve at least a (satisfactory) grade B

Parts 2 and 3 must be passed within two years of the successful part 1 attempt. In addition to this, parts 2 and 3 are limited to three attempts in any two-year period. If one does not qualify in this two-year period they must re-apply and re-take all the examinations.

An instructor must display proof they are legally allowed to accept payment for driver training. They must:

- Display a green badge in the left side of the windscreen of the training vehicle showing their photo, name and confirming their entry on the Register. (This is not required in Northern Ireland at present.)
- Display a red/pink badge as a licensed trainee instructor provided they have passed their part 2 and have undergone a minimum amount of training. This licence is only valid for six months and is designed to give prospective driving instructors (PDIs') valuable experience for their part 3 examination. (Nb This is not required in Northern Ireland at present)

== Maintaining ADI registration ==
Registered ADIs need to take a test of their 'continued ability and fitness to give instruction' during their period of registration. These are commonly known as 'check tests'.

The check test was replaced in April 2014 by the new Standards Check. Standard Checks are carried out by a supervising examiner from the Driving and Vehicle Standards Agency (DVSA). During this test ADIs' will be tested against the ‘National standard for driver and rider training’ criteria. They are designed to ensure that ADIs are keeping up the proper standards of instruction. The tests normally take place during working hours from Mondays to Fridays. The check test lasts for about an hour, with a 15-minute debrief afterwards without the pupil being present.

It is a condition of the ADI register that ADIs' make themselves available for check tests when requested. A check test usually involves the examiner assessing the ADIs instructional ability by observing a lesson given to a real pupil. If the ADI doesn't have a pupil available, they may give instruction to someone who holds a full driving licence this must not be another ADI or a PDI who has passed the ADI part 2 exam. During the test they must ensure that their level of instruction is correct for the driver's ability.

The ADI will be given a grading at the end of the test - grade B being the lower grade and grade A the higher. If the ADI is assessed as un-satisfactory, they will be asked to retake the check test again within a short period of time. If the ADI displays a lower than acceptable level of instruction on three consecutive occasions, steps will be taken to remove him/her from the ADI register.

== Continuing professional development ==
Continuing professional development (CPD) can be both formal and informal professional development, based on an individual's needs. To maximise individual potential and retain credibility within the profession it is essential that ADIs maintain high levels of professional competence. ADIs can make a commitment towards professionalism by keeping up to date and continually seeking to improve their knowledge and expertise. The DSA is currently working with representative organisations and other stakeholders to develop a structured CPD scheme in preparation for a public consultation on modernising driver training.
