= Driver and Vehicle Standards Agency =

UK Department for Transport Agency

- Logo of the Driver and Vehicle Standards Agency

Agency overview
- Formed: 1 April 2014 (12 years ago)
- Preceding agency: Driving Standards Agency, Vehicle and Operator Services Agency
- Type: Executive agency
- Jurisdiction: Government of the United Kingdom
- Headquarters: Croydon Street, Bristol, BS5 0DA, United Kingdom
- Motto: Keeping Britain moving, safely and sustainably
- Employees: 4,600
- Agency executive: Loveday Ryder, Chief executive
- Parent department: Department for Transport
- Key documents: DVSA vision to 2030; DVSA strategic plan to 2025
- Website: gov.uk/dvsa

The Driver and Vehicle Standards Agency (DVSA) is an executive agency of the UK Department for Transport (DfT).

It carries out driving tests, approves people to be driving instructors and MOT testers, carries out tests to make sure lorries and buses are safe to drive, carries out roadside checks on drivers and vehicles, and monitors vehicle recalls. It is a separate organisation from the similarly named Driver and Vehicle Licensing Agency (DVLA).

The responsibilities of DVSA only cover Great Britain. In Northern Ireland, the same role is carried out by the Driver and Vehicle Agency (DVA).

== History ==
It was announced on 20 June 2013 that the Driving Standards Agency (DSA) and Vehicle and Operator Services Agency (VOSA) would merge into a single agency in 2014. The name of the new agency was confirmed as the Driver and Vehicle Standards Agency (DVSA) on 28 November 2013.

DSA and VOSA closed on 31 March 2014, and DVSA took over their responsibilities on 1 April 2014.

DVSA was a trading fund from its creation until 31 March 2021.

== Purpose and aims ==
Between 30 March 2017 and 3 April 2023, DVSA’s stated purpose was "helping you stay safe on Britain's roads".

On 4 April 2023, DVSA announced its purpose was changing to "keeping Britain moving, safely and sustainably". It does this by:

- helping people through a lifetime of safe and sustainable journeys
- helping people keep their vehicles safe to drive
- protecting people from unsafe drivers and vehicles

On 4 April 2023, DVSA published a vision to 2030 setting out how it will deal with challenges including making roads safer, making road transport greener and harnessing new technologies such as self-driving cars.

== Responsibilities ==
DVSA is responsible for:

- setting the standard for safe and responsible driving and riding
- carrying out theory and practical driving tests for all types of motor vehicles
- maintaining the register of approved driving instructors
- approving training bodies and instructors to provide compulsory basic training and direct access scheme courses for motorcyclists
- running the tests that allow people to join and stay on the voluntary register of driver trainers who train drivers of car and van fleets
- setting the standards for the drink-drive rehabilitation scheme, running the scheme and approving the courses that offenders can take
- conducting annual testing of lorries, buses and trailers through authorised testing facilities (ATFs) and goods vehicle testing stations (GVTS)
- conducting routine and targeted checks on vehicles, drivers and operators ensuring compliance with road safety legislation and environmental standards
- supervising the MOT scheme so that over 20,000 authorised garages carry out MOT tests to the correct standards
- providing administrative support to the Traffic commissioners in considering and processing applications for licenses to operate lorries, buses, coaches and registered bus services
- conducting post-collision investigations
- monitoring products for manufacturing or design defects, highlighting safety concerns and monitoring safety recalls
- providing a range of educational and advisory activities to promote road safety

== Enforcement examiners ==
The DVSA appoints Enforcement Support Officers to patrol and stop vehicles for suspected defects and to check for compliance. Warranted Traffic examiners will then proceed to check the vehicle for Road Traffic regulations' compliance. They wear a uniform, which consists of a blue polo shirt, a high visibility tabbard or jacket, trousers and boots. Some Enforcement Support Officers wear a white-topped cap with a green and white chequered cap band (similar to police traffic officers).

=== Powers ===
Under the Police Reform Act 2002, section 41 and Schedule 5, Chief Constables could grant powers (under a Community Safety Accreditation Scheme) to DVSA (originally VOSA) officers to stop vehicles for checks on vehicle and driver compliance without the need for police support (later expanded to stop any vehicle, although mainly goods and passenger carrying vehicles). At that time, only police officers had the power to stop vehicles and therefore had to be present. The powers were piloted in 2003, and brought more widely into force in 2004.

Following a consultation in July 2010, the law was overhauled in 2011 to grant VOSA/DVSA officers the power to stop vehicles without relying on police approval through Community Safety Accreditation Schemes as above. This also allowed VOSA/DVSA officers to stop vehicles in Scotland, as well as in England and Wales as previously. The amendment, which was made by the Road Vehicles (Powers to Stop) Regulations 2011, allows "stopping officers" approved by the Department for Transport to stop vehicles for certain reasons.

To be appointed as a stopping officer, a person must:

- be a suitable person to exercise the powers of a stopping officer
- be capable of effectively exercising their powers
- have received adequate training for the exercise of their powers

Officers must be in uniform to stop vehicles. Impersonating or obstructing stopping officers is an offence.

== See also ==
- Driving examiner (United Kingdom)
- National Highways
