= Driver and Vehicle Agency =

Government agency in Northern Ireland

Agency overview
- Formed: 2007; 19 years ago
- Preceding agencies: DVLNI; DVTA
- Jurisdiction: Northern Ireland
- Headquarters: Coleraine, Northern Ireland
- Employees: 756
- Agency executive: Liz Kimmins, Minister for Infrastructure
- Parent department: Department for Infrastructure
- Website: https://www.nidirect.gov.uk/contacts/driver-vehicle-agency-dva-northern-ireland

The Driver and Vehicle Agency (DVA; Irish: An Ghníomhaireacht Tiománaithe agus Feithiclí) is a government agency of the Department for Infrastructure in Northern Ireland. The agency is responsible for conducting vehicle testing, driver testing and the issuance of driving licences.

It was created in early 2007 through the merger of the Driver and Vehicle Licensing Northern Ireland (DVLNI) and the Driver and Vehicle Testing Agency (DVTA).

== Driver and vehicle testing ==
In Northern Ireland, the DVA is responsible for carrying out the practical driving test, and theory test to allow residents to obtain their full licence. The theory test is the same as the rest of the UK, and is set by the DVSA. Practical driving tests follow a similar format to the rest of the UK, however, some aspects of the test are different and the DVA can change it at any time.

The DVA also carry out vehicle MOT testing, unlike in Great Britain, vehicles requiring MOT/PSV testing must attend a DVA MOT centre. As of 2026, the DVA operates 17 centres across Northern Ireland.

== Driver and Vehicle Licensing ==
The DVA is responsible for driver licensing in Northern Ireland, as this is a devolved matter, and issues both provisional and full driving licences.

Any licence issued by the DVA is a UK driving licence, and is treated exactly the same as a GB licence.

Unlike the DVLA, the DVA still issues paper counterparts with all versions of the NI driving licence.

== Previous Responsibilities ==
Prior to 2014, the DVA was also responsible for vehicle registration and vehicle tax. This responsibility was transferred to the DVLA. Personalised (private) registrations must now be purchased through the DVLA directly, and customers are recommended to tax their vehicles online.

Customers can still tax their vehicles in person at a Post Office branch in Northern Ireland.

== See also ==
- United Kingdom driving test
- Driving licence in the United Kingdom
- Driver and Vehicle Licensing Agency
- Driver and Vehicle Standards Agency
- Department for Infrastructure (Northern Ireland)
