= Stockard =

Stockard may refer to:

== People ==
- Stockard Channing, American actress
- Bessie Stockard, American tennis player and women's basketball coach
- Charles Rupert Stockard (1879–1939), American anatomist and zoologist
- John Stockard (died 1861), American politician from North Carolina
- Sallie Walker Stockard (1869–1963), American professor of history and author
- Ted Stockard (1903–1962), American baseball player

== Other ==
- Stockard, Texas, United States
- Stockard Steamship Corporation
