= Vehicle registration plates of the United States for 1982 =

1982 license plates in the United States

Vehicle registration plates of the United States by year
Vehicle registration plates of the United States for 1981	Events of 1982	Vehicle registration plates of the United States for 1983

Each of the 50 states of the United States of America plus several of its territories and the District of Columbia issued individual passenger license plates for 1982.

== Passenger baseplates ==
Passenger Car Plates
Image	Region	Design	Slogan	Serial format	Serials issued	Notes
	Alabama	Embossed red serial on reflective white plate; "Alabama" screened in dark blue centered at top.	"HEART OF DIXIE" in white within dark blue heart screened at top left			
	Alaska					
	American Samoa					
	Arizona	Red background with embossed white serial, embossed cactus separator in middle.	"GRAND CANYON STATE" centered embossed at bottom.			
	Arkansas	Embossed red numbers on reflective white plate; "Arkansas" screened in blue centered at top	"Land of Opportunity" screened in blue centered at bottom	ABC 123	GED 001 to POP 999	Issued from 1978 to 1988.
	California					
	Colorado					
	Connecticut					
	Delaware					
	District of Columbia					
	Florida					
	Georgia					
	Guam					
	Hawaii					
	Idaho					
	Illinois					
	Indiana					
	Iowa					
	Kansas	Embossed blue serial on reflective white plate; gold sunflower and wheat stalk graphic screened at top left; "KANSAS" screened in blue centered at top		A/B C12345	Coded by county of issuance (A/B) and month of expiration (C)	Continued from where the blue 1980-81 plates left off. First reflective plate for Kansas
	Kentucky					
	Louisiana					
	Maine					
	Maryland					
	Massachusetts					
	Michigan					
	Minnesota					
	Mississippi					
	Missouri					
	Montana					
	Nebraska					
	Nevada					
	New Hampshire					
	New Jersey					
	New Mexico					
	New York					
	North Carolina					
	North Dakota					
	Northern Mariana; Islands					
	Ohio					
	Oklahoma					
	Oregon					
	Pennsylvania					
	Puerto Rico					
	Rhode Island					
	South Carolina					
	South Dakota					
	Tennessee					
	Texas					
	Utah					
	Vermont					
	Virginia	Embossed dark blue serial on reflective white plate with border line; "Virginia" screened in blue centered at top.	None	ABC-123		Still currently revalidated.
	Washington					
	West Virginia	Embossed dark blue numbers on reflective white plate; yellow state shape with blue outline screened at left behind numbers; "WEST VIRGINIA" screened in dark blue centered at bottom.	Dark blue bar screened at top, with "Wild, Wonderful" in white in the center.			
	Wisconsin	Embossed black serial on reflective yellow plate; "WISCONSIN" at bottom, slogan at top; month of expiration at bottom left, debossed "80" at bottom right	AMERICA'S DAIRYLAND	A12-345; AB 1234	Coded by month of expiration (A)	Revalidated for 1982 with white on red stickers.
	Wyoming					

== Non-passenger plates ==
Non-passenger Plates
Image (standard)	Region	Type	Design & Slogan	Serial format	Serials issued	Notes
	Alaska	Truck	Embossed red serial on reflective white plate; "ALASKA" at top, debossed "76" at top right	1234 AB	1000 AA to approximately 1999 AN	Revalidated for 1982 with white on blue stickers. Replaced between May 1981 and April 1982.
	Alaska	Truck	Embossed red serial on reflective white plate; "ALASKA" at top, debossed "77" at top right	1234 AB	2000 AN to approximately 2999 AR	Revalidated for 1982 with white on blue stickers. Replaced between May 1981 and April 1982.
	Alaska	Truck	Embossed red serial on reflective white plate; "ALASKA" at top, debossed "78" at top right	1234 AB	3000 AR to approximately 9999 AU	Revalidated for 1982 with white on blue stickers. Replaced between May 1981 and April 1982.
	Alaska	Truck	Embossed red serial on reflective white plate; "ALASKA" at top	1234 AB	1000 AV to approximately 9999 AV	Revalidated for 1982 with white on blue stickers. Replaced between May 1981 and April 1982.
	Alaska	Truck	Embossed dark blue serial on reflective golden yellow plate with border line; black "ALASKA" screened at top	1234 AB	1000 BA to approximately 9999 DS	Revalidated for 1982 with white on blue stickers.
	Maine	Trailer	Embossed black serial on reflective white plate with border line; "MAINE 74" at top left, "TRAILER" at bottom	123-456	1 to approximately 125-000, 150-001 to 205-000	Validated for 1982 with white on light brown stickers.
	Maine	Trailer	Embossed black serial on reflective white plate with border line; "MAINE 74" at top, "TRAILER" at bottom	123-456	125-001 to approximately 150-000	Validated for 1982 with white on light brown stickers.
	Maine	Trailer	Embossed black serial on reflective white plate with border line; "MAINE" at top offset to left, "TRAILER" at bottom	123-456	205-001 to approximately 362-000	Validated for 1982 with white on light brown stickers.
	Maine	Trailer	Embossed black serial on reflective white plate with border line; "MAINE" at top, "TRAILER" at bottom	123-456	362-001 to approximately 599-999	Validated for 1982 with white on light brown stickers.
	Wisconsin	Private semi-trailer	Embossed white serial on green plate with border line; "WISCONSIN" at bottom, "SEMI TRAILER" at top; debossed "82" at bottom right	P/E12345	P/E 1 to approximately P/E22000	
	Wisconsin	Insert trailer	Embossed white serial on green plate with border line; "WISCONSIN" at bottom, "TRAILER" at top; "82" at bottom right	A/B1234	Coded by weight class (A)	Revalidated with quarterly stickers. The colors for each quarter are as follows: 1 - yellow on red, 2 - white on blue, 3 - blue on yellow, 4 - blue on silver. Weight classes are A, B, C, D, E, F, G, H, J, K, L, N, P, Q, R, S, and T.

== See also ==
- Antique vehicle registration
- Electronic license plate
- Motor vehicle registration
- Vehicle license
