= Government of the District of Columbia =

Coordinates: 38°54′17″N 77°00′59″W

- Seal of Washington, D.C.
- Formation: February 27, 1801; 225 years ago
- Home rule charter: District of Columbia Home Rule Act
- Website: dc.gov

City-wide elected officials
- Attorney General: Attorney General for the District of Columbia

Legislative branch
- Legislature: Council of the District of Columbia
- Meeting place: John A. Wilson Building

Executive branch
- Mayor: Mayor of the District of Columbia
- Appointed by: Election
- Departments: See List of District of Columbia agencies

Judicial branch
- Seat: H. Carl Moultrie Courthouse

The Government of the District of Columbia is the governmental structure of the U.S. federal district of the District of Columbia, as established by the Article One of the United States Constitution and the District of Columbia Home Rule Act. The Home Rule Act devolves certain powers of the United States Congress to the local government, which consists of a mayor and a 13-member council. However, Congress retains the right to review and overturn laws created by the council and intervene in local affairs.

As mandated in the Home Rule Act, the District of Columbia is organized into eight Wards for electoral and administrative purposes, numbered one through eight in a roughly clockwise spiral manner. These are the only functional subdivisions remaining within the city, as the local government of Georgetown was absorbed into the overall District in 1871. All elected positions of the District government serve four year terms. Each ward elects one member to the Council, alongside 4 at-large seats and a separate council chair which are elected by the entire city. The mayor and attorney general are elected on the midterm election cycle, while the Council is roughly split to be even between the midterm cycle and the presidential cycle. All scheduled regular elections happen in even years, while special elections to fill vacated positions are held as necessary.

Due to its unique status as simultaneously being a state-level entity, a county equivalent, and having unitary municipal rule over all of its territory, the District government must assume the functions of all three roles and thus has a relatively higher budget relative to other governments of cities of its magnitude. The mayor is generally regarded as equivalent to a state governor at the national level, but due to DC's status as a federal district the mayor does not have some of the powers generally afforded such as control over the District of Columbia National Guard, which instead lies with the President of the United States. Likewise, the Council also serves in a capacity similar to that of a state legislature but the Constitution mandates that Congress still has the ultimate authority over the district.

== Organization ==
Similar to the Federal government of the United States, the District of Columbia has an executive branch, a legislative branch, and a judicial branch.

=== Executive ===
The mayor of the District of Columbia is the head of the executive branch. The mayor has the duty to enforce city laws, and the power to either approve or veto bills passed by the council. In addition, the mayor oversees all city services, public property, police and fire protection, most public agencies, and the District of Columbia Public Schools. The mayor's office oversees an annual city budget of $8.8 billion.

The mayor appoints five deputy mayors: the Deputy Mayor for Education, the Deputy Mayor for Health and Human Services, the Deputy Mayor for Planning and Economic Development, the Deputy Mayor for Public Safety and Justice, and the Deputy Mayor for Operations and Infrastructure. Each Deputy Mayor's office has oversight over certain relevant government agencies. For example, the Deputy Mayor for Health and Human Services oversees D.C. agencies including the Department of Health Care Finance, Department of Human Services, and the Department of Disability Services.

==== Government agencies ====
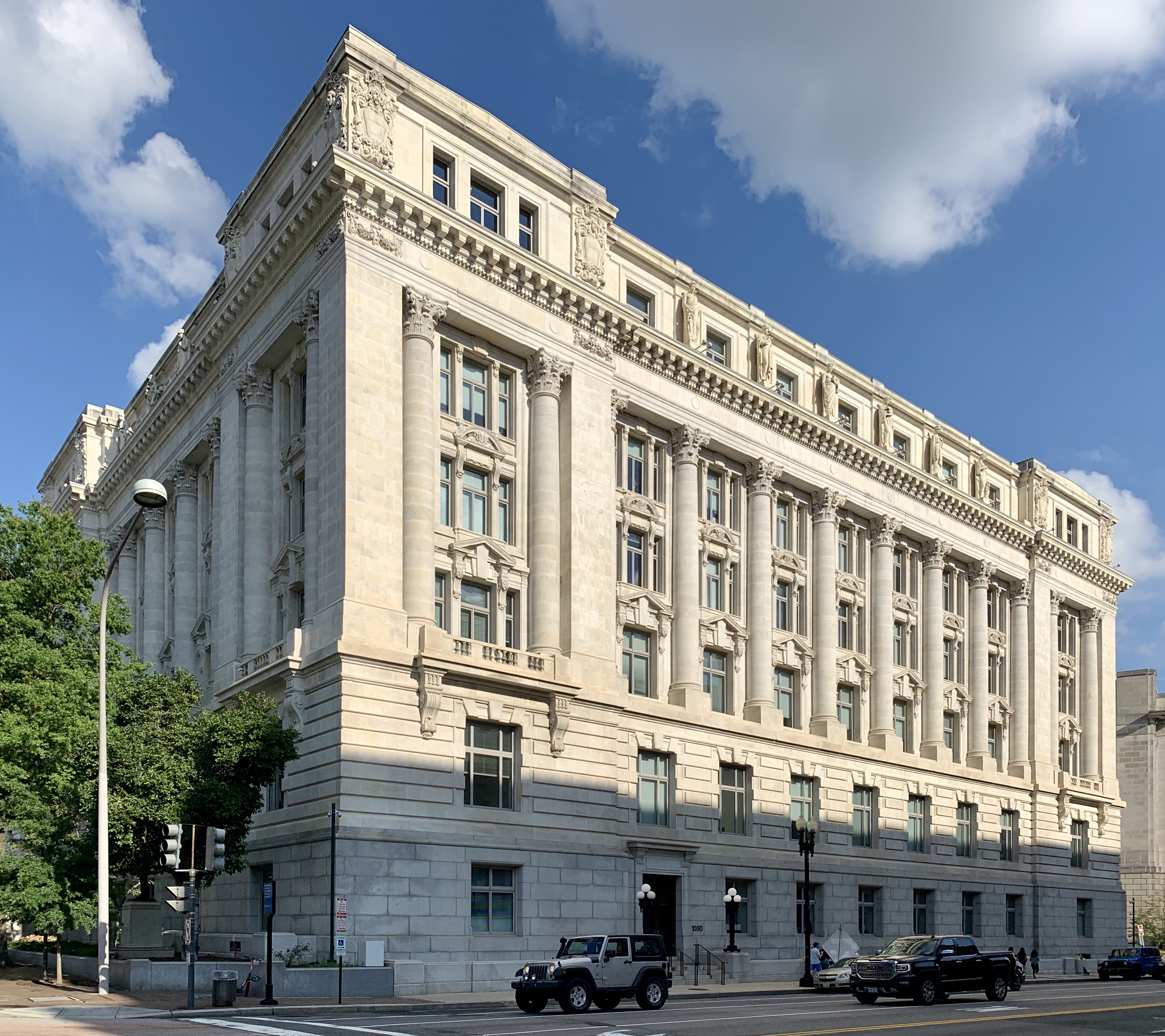
The John A. Wilson Building houses offices for the mayor and council members.

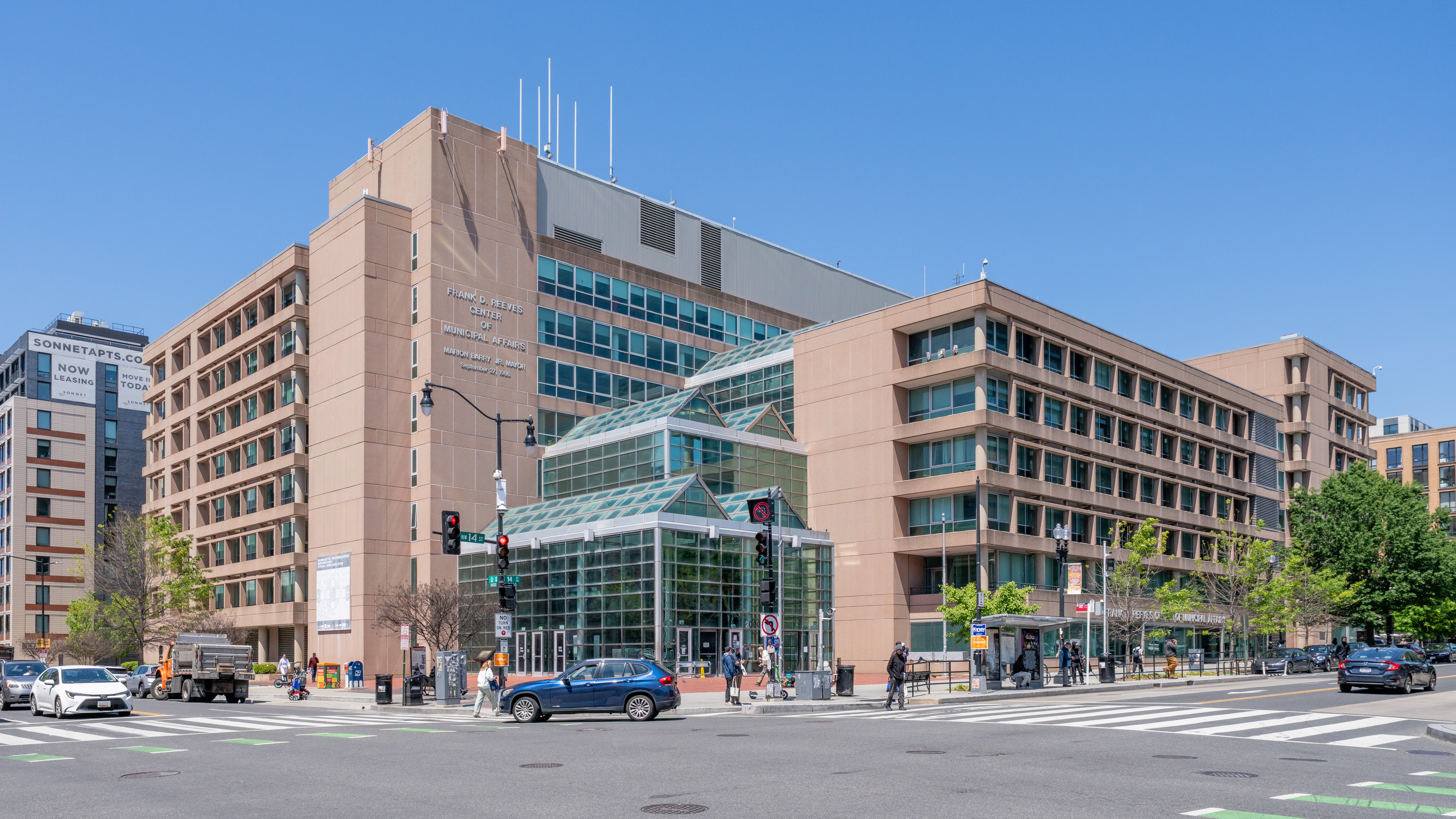
The Frank D. Reeves Municipal Center houses multiple local government agencies.

There are two types of agencies as laid out by the Code of the District of Columbia. The first are called "subordinate" agencies and answer to the Mayor's Office. They may also be called "public agencies" or "government agencies". Most of these subordinate agencies are organized under the office of the relevant Deputy Mayor: Subordinate agencies differ from independent agencies that, while created by the legislature, do not answer directly to the Mayor's Office.

As of November 2024, the subordinate agencies include:

- Office of the Deputy Mayor for Operations and Infrastructure (DMOI)
  - District Department of Transportation (DDOT)
  - Department of Motor Vehicles (DC DMV)
  - Department of Public Works (DPW)
  - Department of For-Hire Vehicles (DFHV)
  - District of Columbia Department of Licensing and Consumer Protection (DLCP)
  - Department of Energy and Environment (DOEE)
  - Department of Insurance, Securities and Banking (DISB)
- Office of the Deputy Mayor for Health and Human Services (DMHHS)
  - DC Health
  - Department of Human Services (DHS)
  - Child and Family Services Agency (CFSA)
  - Department of Disability Services (DDS)
  - Department of Behavioral Health (DBH)
    - St. Elizabeths Hospital is the state psychiatric hospital of DC
  - Department of Health Care Finance (DHCF)
  - Department of Aging and Community Living (DACL)
  - Thrive by Five
- Office of the Deputy Mayor for Planning and Economic Development (DMPED)
  - Department of Buildings
  - Department of Housing and Community Development (DHCD)
  - Department of Insurance, Securities, and Banking
  - Department of Licensing and Consumer Protection
  - Department of Small and Local Business Development
  - Office of Planning (OP)
  - Office of Cable Television, Film, Music and Entertainment (OCTFME)
- Office of the Deputy Mayor for Education (DME)
  - District of Columbia Public Schools (DCPS)
  - Office of the State Superintendent of Education (OSSE)
  - Department of Parks and Recreation (DPR)
  - Department of Employment Services (DOES)
  - DC Workforce Investment Council (WIC)
- Office of the Deputy Mayor for Public Safety and Justice (DMPSJ)
  - Metropolitan Police Department (MPD)
  - District of Columbia National Guard
  - District of Columbia Department of Corrections (DOC)
  - District of Columbia Department of Forensic Services
  - Department of Youth Rehabilitation Services (DYRS)
  - District of Columbia Fire and Emergency Medical Services Department (FEMS)
  - Homeland Security and Emergency Management Agency (HSEMA)
  - Office of Human Rights (OHR)
  - Office of Neighborhood Safety and Engagement (ONSE)
  - Office of the Chief Medical Examiner (OCME)
  - Office of Unified Communications
  - Office of Victim Services and Justice Grants (OVSJG)
  - Office on Returning Citizen Affairs
- Assistant City Administrator for Government Operations
  - Department of For-Hire Vehicles
  - Department of General Services
  - Department of Human Resources
  - Department of Motor Vehicles
  - Office of Contracting and Procurement
  - Office of Disability Rights
  - Office of Risk Management
  - Office of the Chief Technology Officer

=== Legislative ===
The Council of the District of Columbia is the legislative branch. Each of the city's eight wards elects a single member of the council and residents elect four at-large members to represent the District as a whole. The council chair is also elected at-large.

=== Judiciary ===
The Superior Court of the District of Columbia is the local trial court. It hears cases involving criminal and civil law. The court also handles specialized cases in the following areas: family court, landlord and tenant, probate, tax, and traffic offenses. The Court consists of a chief judge and 61 associate judges. The Court is assisted by the service of 24 magistrate judges and retired judges who have been recommended and approved as senior judges. Judges are appointed to the court by the President of the United States, without any District (mayoral or council) input, and confirmed by the U.S. Senate for fifteen-year terms.

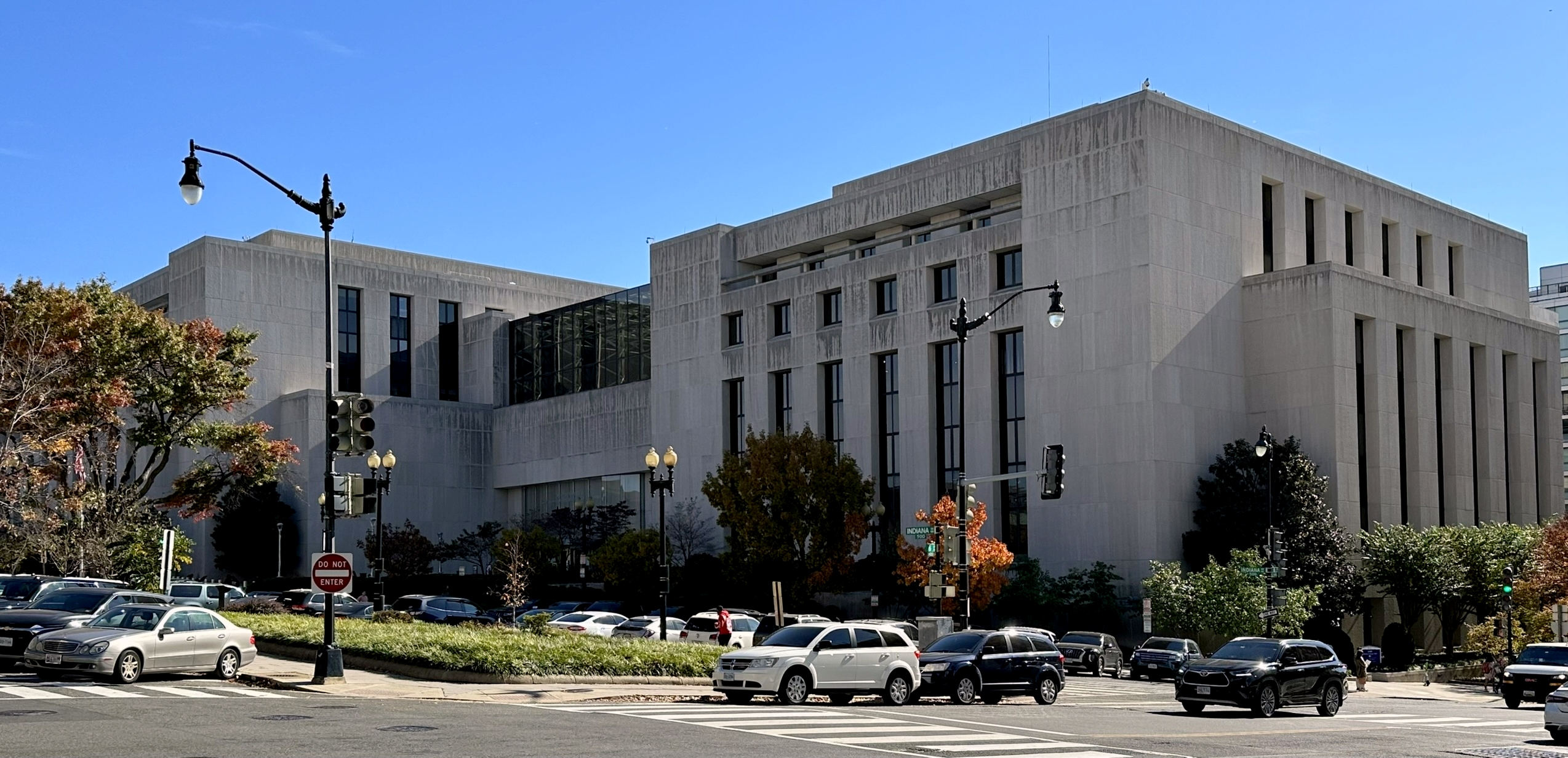
The Superior Court is housed in the H. Carl Moultrie Courthouse.

All appeals of Superior Court decisions go to the District of Columbia Court of Appeals, which is the highest court. Established in 1970, it is equivalent to a state supreme court, except that its authority is derived from the United States Congress rather than from the inherent sovereignty of the states. The Court of Appeals should not be confused with the District's federal appellate court, the United States Court of Appeals for the District of Columbia Circuit.

The Court of Appeals is authorized to review all final orders, judgments, and specified interlocutory orders of the associate judges of the Superior Court, to review decisions of administrative agencies, boards, and commissions of the District government, and to answer questions of law presented by the Supreme Court of the United States, a United States court of appeals, or the highest appellate court of any state. The court consists of a chief judge and eight associate judges. The court is assisted by retired judges who have been recommended and approved as senior judges. Despite being the District's local appellate court, judges are appointed by the U.S. president and confirmed by the U.S. Senate for 15-year terms. The DC Courts are a federal agency and do not answer to the District government.

=== Attorney General ===
The Attorney General of the District of Columbia is the chief legal officer of the District. Until a charter amendment in 2010 that made the office an elected position, the post was appointed by the mayor. Following numerous election delays, Karl Racine was elected in 2014 and sworn into office in January 2015.

=== Independent agencies ===
In the District of Columbia, independent agencies are those which are not under the direct control of the Mayor's office. They may also be called "quasi-public" or "quasi-governmental" agencies.

For example, the District of Columbia Public Schools (DCPS) is the local public school system and answers to the mayor through the Deputy Mayor for Education. However, the District of Columbia Public Charter School Board (PCSB) was created in 1996 as a second, independent agency with authorization authority for public charter schools. The DC Council passed legislation in 2007 giving the DC mayor direct authority over the DCPS and transferred the oversight responsibility for the charter schools previously authorized by the DC Board of Education to the PCSB.

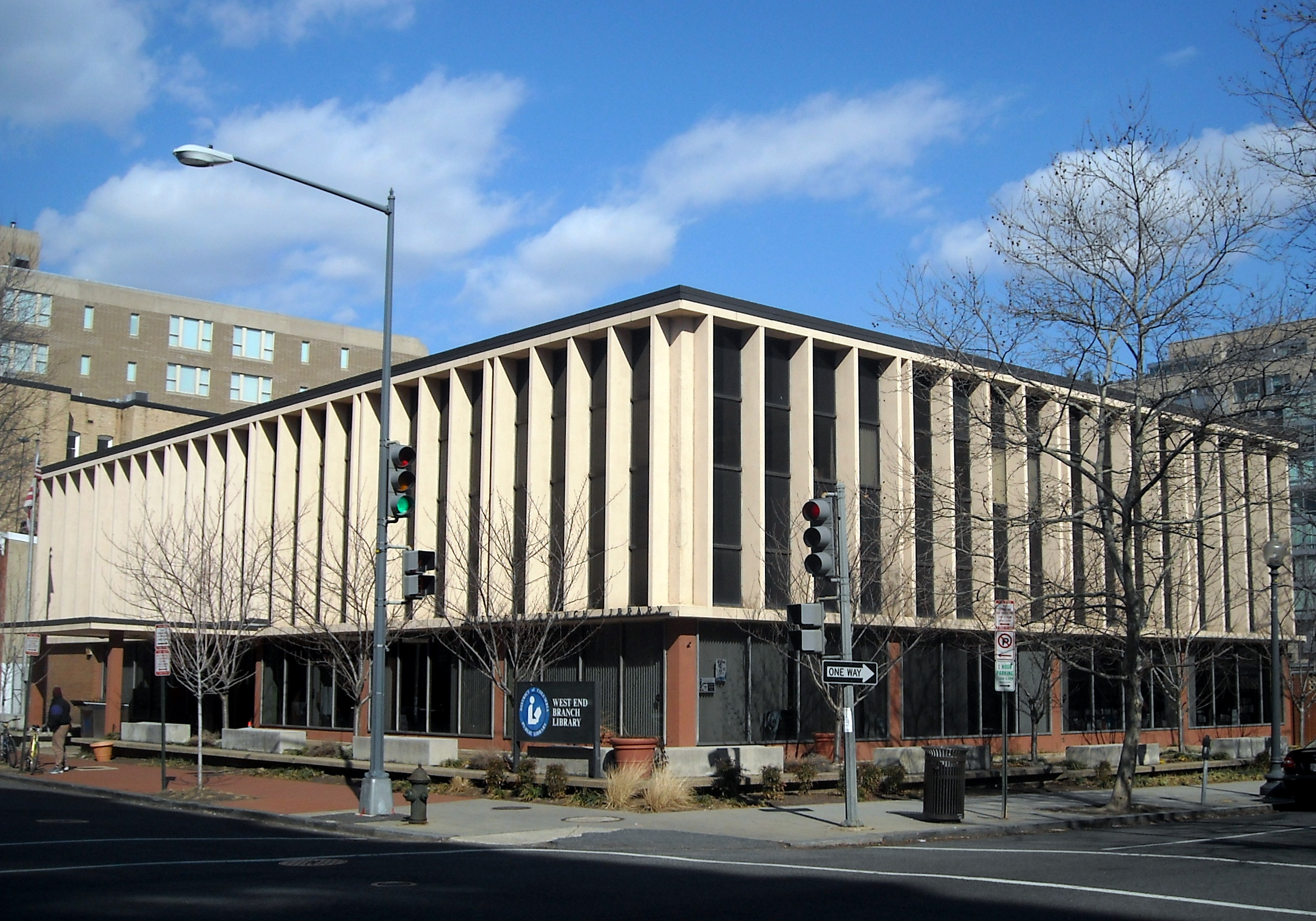
The West End Neighborhood Library of the District of Columbia Public Library

Independent agencies often work with subordinate agencies and the Mayor's Office, and their members may be appointed by the mayor. For example, the Alcoholic Beverage and Cannabis Administration (ABCA) is an independent adjudicatory body responsible for the District's regulatory authority for alcoholic beverage and cannabis.

Each independent agency is sponsored by a deputy mayor:

Independent agencies as of November 2024
| Executive branch cluster | Independent agency |
|---|---|
| Health and Human Services | District of Columbia Health Benefit Exchange Authority; District of Columbia Not-for-Profit Hospital Corporation |
| Planning and Economic Development | District of Columbia Alcoholic Beverage and Cannabis Administration; District of Columbia Commission on the Arts and Humanities; District of Columbia Housing Authority; District of Columbia Housing Finance Agency; District of Columbia Office of the Tenant Advocate; District of Columbia Office of Zoning; District of Columbia Real Property Tax; District of Columbia Real Property Tax Appeals Commission; District of Columbia Rental Housing Commission; Events DC (formerly the Washington Convention and Sports Authority); District of Columbia Zoning Commission |
| Education | District of Columbia Public Library; District of Columbia State Athletic Commission; District of Columbia Public Charter School Board; District of Columbia State Board of Education; University of the District of Columbia |
| Public Safety and Justice | District of Columbia Corrections Information Council; District of Columbia Criminal Justice Coordinating Council; District of Columbia Office of Police Complaints; District of Columbia Uniform Law Commission |
| | District of Columbia Board of Elections; District of Columbia Board of Ethics and Government Accountability; District of Columbia Campaign Finance Board; District of Columbia Contract Appeals Board; District of Columbia Retirement Board; District of Columbia Water and Sewer Authority |

=== Advisory neighborhood commissions ===
There are 37 advisory neighborhood commissions (ANCs) elected by small neighborhood districts. ANCs can issue recommendations on all issues that affect residents; government agencies take their advice under careful consideration.

== Budget ==
The mayor and council set local taxes and a budget, which Congress must approve.

== Employment ==
According to the District of Columbia's Department of Human Resources, 20% of the DC government workforce will be eligible for retirement in 2021. The DC government offers a host of internship opportunities for recent graduates seeking employment.

== Law ==
Front cover of the District of Columbia Register

The Code of the District of Columbia is the subject compilation of enacted legislation, and also contains federal statutes which affect the District of Columbia. The District of Columbia Municipal Regulations (DCMR) is the publication and compilation of the current regulations. The District of Columbia Register (DCR) gives brief information of actions of the Council of the District of Columbia (such as resolutions and notices of council hearings) and actions of the executive branch and independent agencies (such as proposed and emergency rulemaking).

The District observes all federal holidays and also celebrates Emancipation Day on April 16, which commemorates the end of slavery in the District. The flag of the District of Columbia was adopted in 1938 and is a variation on George Washington's family coat of arms.

== Politics ==
=== Budget deficits ===
The city's local government, particularly during the mayoralty of Marion Barry, was criticized for mismanagement and waste. During his administration in 1989, The Washington Monthly magazine claimed that the District had "the worst city government in America." In 1995, at the start of Barry's fourth term, Congress created the District of Columbia Financial Control Board to oversee all municipal spending. The same legislation created a Chief Financial Officer position for the District, which operates independently of the mayor and council. Mayor Anthony Williams won election in 1998 and oversaw a period of urban renewal and budget surpluses. The District regained control over its finances in 2001 and the oversight board's operations were suspended.

The Government Accountability Office and other analysts have estimated that the city's high percentage of tax-exempt property and the Congressional prohibition of commuter taxes create a structural deficit in the District's local budget of anywhere between $470 million and over $1 billion per year. Congress typically provides additional grants for federal programs such as Medicaid and the operation of the local justice system; however, analysts claim that the payments do not fully resolve the imbalance.

=== Voting rights debate ===
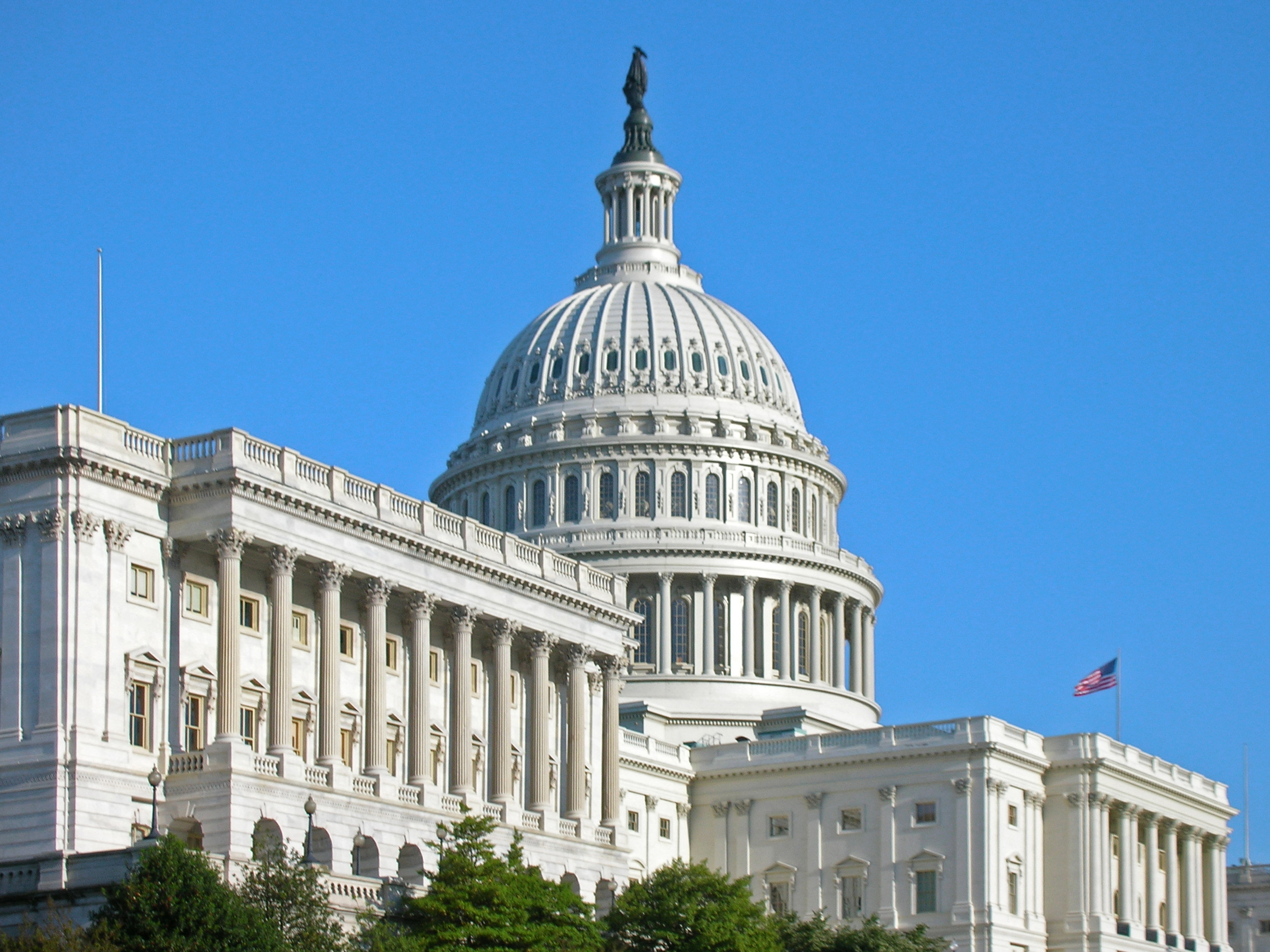
The United States Congress has ultimate authority over the District.

The District is not a U.S. state and therefore has no voting representation in the Congress. D.C. residents elect a non-voting delegate to the House of Representatives, currently Eleanor Holmes Norton (D-D.C. at-large), who may sit on committees, participate in debate, and introduce legislation, but cannot vote on the House floor. The District has no official representation in the United States Senate. Neither chamber seats the District's elected "shadow" representative or senators. D.C. residents are subject to all U.S. federal taxes. In the financial year 2012, D.C. residents and businesses paid $20.7 billion in federal taxes; more than the taxes collected from 19 states and the highest federal taxes per capita.

A 2005 poll found that 78% of Americans did not know that residents of the District of Columbia have less representation in Congress than residents of the 50 states. Efforts to raise awareness about the issue have included campaigns by grassroots organizations and featuring the city's unofficial motto, "No taxation without representation", on District of Columbia vehicle license plates. There is evidence of nationwide approval for D.C. voting rights; various polls indicate that 61 to 82% of Americans believe that D.C. should have voting representation in Congress. Despite public support, attempts to grant the District voting representation, including the D.C. statehood movement and the proposed District of Columbia Voting Rights Amendment, have been unsuccessful.

Opponents of D.C. voting rights propose that the Founding Fathers never intended for District residents to have a vote in Congress since the Constitution makes clear that representation must come from the states. Those opposed to making D.C. a state claim that such a move would destroy the notion of a separate national capital and that statehood would unfairly grant Senate representation to a single city.

== History ==
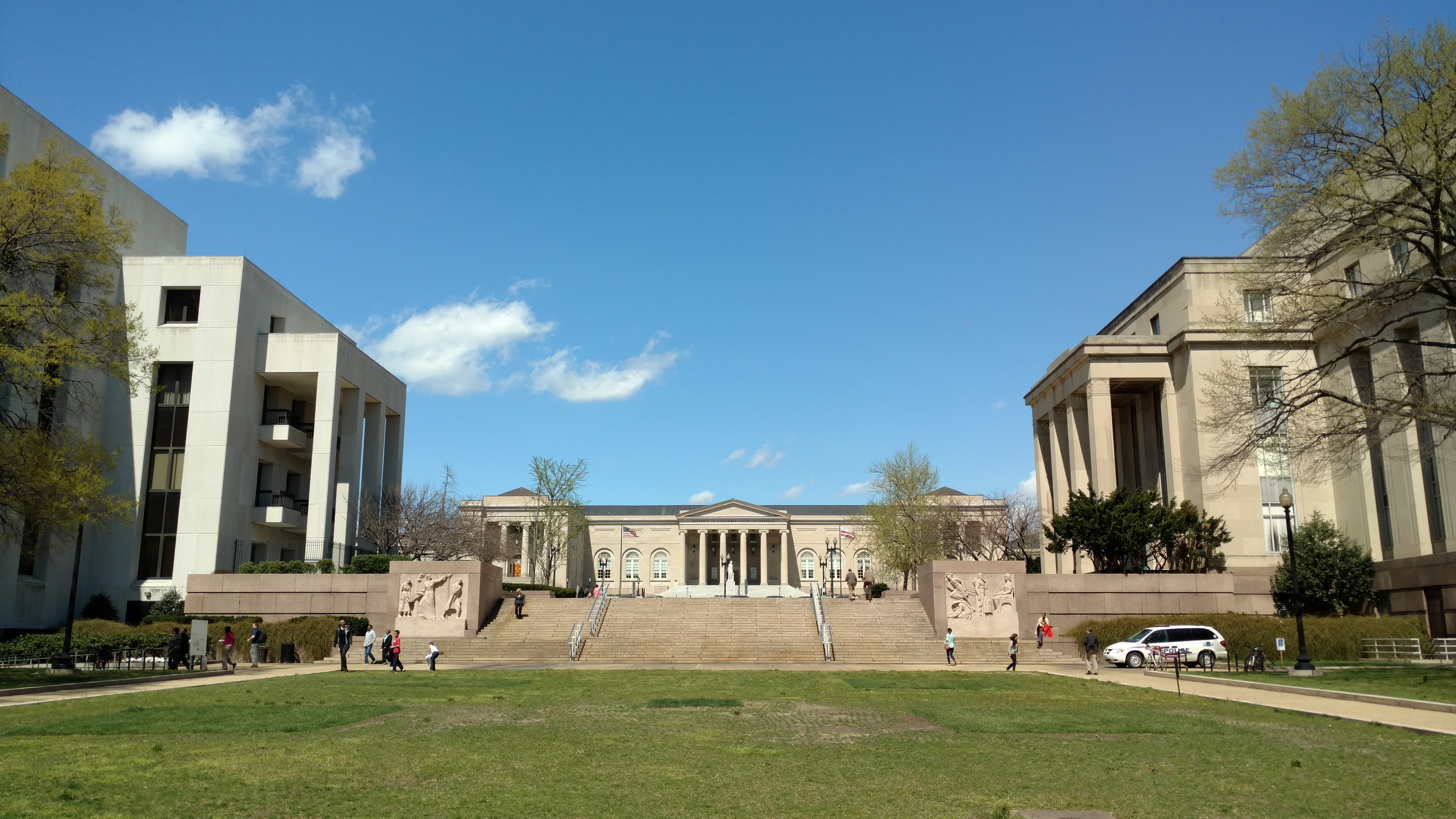
The District's historic City Hall framed by the H. Carl Moultrie Courthouse & Metropolitan Police Headquarters

The District of Columbia Organic Act of 1801 is an organic act enacted by Congress under Article 1, Section 8 of the United States Constitution that formally placed the District of Columbia under the control of Congress and organized the unincorporated territory within the District into two counties: Washington County to the north and east of the Potomac River and Alexandria County to the west and south; left in place and made no change to the status of the charters of the existing cities of Georgetown and Alexandria; and established a court in each of the new counties, with the common law of both Maryland and Virginia continuing to remain in force within the District.

The District of Columbia Organic Act of 1871 repealed the individual charters of the cities of Washington and Georgetown and established a new territorial government for the whole District of Columbia. Though Congress repealed the territorial government in 1874, the legislation was the first to create a single government for the federal district.

The District of Columbia Home Rule Act of 1973 devolved certain congressional powers of the District of Columbia to local government. It enacted the District Charter (also called the Home Rule Charter), furthering District of Columbia home rule.

== Infrastructure ==
In 1980, the city government began contracting with the Humane Rescue Alliance. That organization operated animal shelters, animal control, animal law enforcement, and animal medical services for Washington, DC. On January 1, 2025 the district continued the latter two functions with the Human Rescue Alliance but gave the former two services to the Brandywine Valley SPCA on that date.

== See also ==
- Political party strength in Washington, D.C.
- List of District of Columbia symbols
