= Neal Henderson (ice hockey) =

American coach (born 1937)

Neal Henderson (born July 9, 1937) has been the coach for the Fort Dupont Ice Hockey Club since 1978. Black players have mainly been on his team leading up to the 2020s. Before starting the Washington, D.C. team, Henderson was a hockey player and became a coach at Hill Air Force Base. Between the late 1990s to early 2000s, Henderson was the vice president for the NHL/USA Hockey Diversity Task Force. In 2005, he co-created the Hockey in the Hood tournament in Detroit. Outside of hockey, Henderson worked for the District of Columbia Department of Motor Vehicles while at Fort Dupont.

Henderson received the 2007 Wm. Thayer Tutt Award from USA Hockey and was nominated for the 2018 Willie O'Ree Community Hero Award held by the NHL. The Washington Capitals selected him to make multiple ceremonial first puck appearances during the late 2010s. In 2019, Henderson joined the United States Hockey Hall of Fame. With this honor, he was the "first black inductee and third person of color" to be picked. Henderson was also selected to become part of the Washington DC Sports Hall of Fame in 2021.

== Early life ==
Henderson was born in Saint Croix on July 9, 1937. During his childhood, he became a hockey player while living in St. Catharines. For his high school education, Henderson went to Washington, D.C. As a student, Henderson continued his playing experience while also working in maintenance for the Uline Arena.

== Career ==
=== Playing and coaching career ===
By the 1960s, Henderson was a hockey player in Salt Lake City, Baltimore and Washington, D.C. During this time period, Henderson became a coach while at Hill Air Force Base. Leading up to the late 1970s, Henderson provided "the frozen driveway of his home in Springdale, Maryland" as a place to play youth hockey. He went to Washington, D.C. during 1978 to create the Fort Dupont Ice Hockey Club. By the late 1980s, Henderson had worked for Hyattsville high schools as their coach.

The Fort Dupont Hockey Club is the longest-running hockey club for Black players or any minority in North America. With Fort Dupont, Henderson teaches hockey to children and adults on his co-ed sports team at Fort Dupont Ice Arena. Leading up to the 2020s, Black players have mainly been on his team. At Fort Dupont, he teaches values and made good grades a requirement. Before his team comes to play, Henderson evaluates the arena and gear. He has also fixed the team's clothing when they were not playing.

=== Additional positions ===
During 1996, Henderson took part in a renovation of the Fort Dupont Ice Rink after it shut down that year. With the NHL/USA Hockey Diversity Task Force, Henderson was their vice president in 1998. In 2003, he continued to hold this position. For Detroit youth, he co-created the Hockey in the Hood tournament with William McCants during 2005. He is a member of the BIPOC Coaches Program created by the NHL Coaches Association.

Outside of hockey, Henderson was an American football and basketball coach while in Washington D. C. While at Fort Dupont, Henderson was working for the District of Columbia Department of Motor Vehicles in 1986. By 2003, he had ended his time at the DMV as their supervisor. He had also worked in automotive safety as an assistant by 2008.

== Awards and honors ==
With "his contribution to Washington area high school athletics", The Washington Post gave the Donald Huff Award to Henderson in 2003. For his volunteerism, USA Hockey gave him the 2007 Wm. Thayer Tutt Award. Henderson received the Bridgestone Mark Messier Youth Leadership Award in 2010. He was a nominee for the 2018 Willie O'Ree Community Hero Award held by the NHL.

In the late 2010s, Henderson was chosen to make multiple ceremonial first puck appearances at Washington Capitals games. During 2019, Coach Neal Henderson Day was created in Washington D. C. by Muriel Bowser. That year, Henderson joined the United States Hockey Hall of Fame. With this honor, Henderson was the "first black inductee and third person of color" to be chosen. He was selected to join the Washington DC Sports Hall of Fame in 2021. Practice equipment recognizing Henderson and Fort Dupont were created by the Capitals in 2022.

The documentary The Cannons (2022) follows Henderson and two Black teenage hockey players he coaches in the Fort Dupont Cannons.
