= Vehicle registration plates of the United States for 1981 =

1981 license plates in the United States

Vehicle registration plates of the United States by year
Vehicle registration plates of the United States for 1980	Events of 1981	Vehicle registration plates of the United States for 1982

Each of the 50 states of the United States of America plus several of its territories and the District of Columbia issued individual passenger license plates for 1981.

== Passenger baseplates ==
Passenger Car Plates
Image	Region	Design	Slogan	Serial format	Serials issued	Notes
	Alabama					
	Alaska					
	American Samoa					
	Arizona					
	Arkansas	Embossed red numbers on reflective white plate; "Arkansas" screened in blue centered at top	"Land of Opportunity" screened in blue centered at bottom	ABC 123	GED 001 to POP 999	Issued from 1978 to 1988.
	California					
	Colorado					
	Connecticut					
	Delaware					
	District of Columbia					
	District of Columbia	Presidential Inauguration				
	Florida					
	Georgia					
	Guam					
	Hawaii					
	Idaho					
	Illinois					
	Indiana					
	Iowa					
	Kansas	Embossed white serial on blue plate; yellow wheat stalk graphic screened at left and "KANSAS" screened in yellow centered at top		A/B C12345	Coded by county of issuance (A/B) and month of expiration (C)	
	Kentucky					
	Louisiana					
	Maine					
	Maryland					
	Massachusetts					
	Michigan					
	Minnesota					
	Mississippi					
	Missouri					
	Montana					
	Nebraska					
	Nevada					
	New Hampshire					
	New Jersey					
	New Mexico					
	New York					
	North Carolina					
	North Dakota					
	Northern Mariana; Islands					
	Ohio					
	Oklahoma					
	Oregon					
	Pennsylvania					
	Puerto Rico					
	Rhode Island					
	South Carolina					
	South Dakota					
	Tennessee					
	Texas					
	Utah					
	Vermont					
	Virginia	Embossed dark blue serial on reflective white plate with border line; "Virginia" screened in blue centered at top.	None	ABC-123		Still currently revalidated.
	Washington					
	West Virginia					
	Wisconsin	Embossed black serial on reflective yellow plate; "WISCONSIN" at bottom, slogan at top; month of expiration at bottom left, debossed "80" at bottom right	AMERICA'S DAIRYLAND	A12-345; AB 1234	Coded by month of expiration (A)	Revalidated for 1981 with white-on-green stickers.
	Wyoming					

== Non-passenger plates ==
Non-passenger Plates
Image (standard)	Region	Type	Design & Slogan	Serial format	Serials issued	Notes
	Maine	Trailer	Embossed black serial on reflective white plate with border line; "MAINE 74" at top offset to left, "TRAILER" at bottom	123-456	1 to approximately 125-000, 150-001 to 205-000	Revalidated for 1981 with white-on-light-brown stickers.
	Maine	Trailer	Embossed black serial on reflective white plate with border line; "MAINE 74" at top, "TRAILER" at bottom	123-456	125-001 to approximately 150-000	Revalidated for 1981 with white-on-light-brown stickers.
	Maine	Trailer	Embossed black serial on reflective white plate with border line; "MAINE" at top offset to left, "TRAILER" at bottom	123-456	205-001 to approximately 362-000	Revalidated for 1981 with white-on-light-brown stickers.
	Maine	Trailer	Embossed black serial on reflective white plate with border line; "MAINE" at top, "TRAILER" at bottom	123-456	362-001 to approximately 599-999	Revalidated for 1981 with white-on-light-brown stickers.

== See also ==
- Antique vehicle registration
- Electronic license plate
- Motor vehicle registration
- Vehicle license
