= Politics of Washington =

Politics of Washington may refer to:

- Politics of Washington (state)
- Politics of Washington, D.C.
- Politics of the United States at the federal level
- The politics of George Washington, the president of the United States from 1789 to 1797
