= Vehicle registration plates of the United States for 1980 =

1980 license plates in the United States

Vehicle registration plates of the United States by year
Vehicle registration plates of the United States for 1979	Events of 1980	Vehicle registration plates of the United States for 1981

Each of the 50 states of the United States of America plus several of its territories and the District of Columbia issued individual passenger license plates for 1980.

== Passenger baseplates ==
Passenger car plates
Image	Region	Design	Slogan	Serial format	Serials issued	Notes
	Alabama	Embossed blue serial on reflective white plate; red Alabama State Capitol graphic screened in the center; state flag, blue rectangle and U.S. Bicentennial logo screened at bottom; "ALABAMA" screened in blue centered at top.	"HEART OF DIXIE" in white within red heart screened at top left	ABC 123		
	Alaska					
	American Samoa					
	Arizona					
	California	Embossed gold serial and "CALIFORNIA" on blue plate	no slogan was used	1ABC234	1AAA000 to 1SWC999	
	Colorado					
	Connecticut					
	Delaware					
	District of Columbia					
	Florida					
	Georgia					
	Guam					
	Hawaii					
	Idaho					
	Illinois					
	Indiana					
	Iowa					
	Kansas	This style introduced in 1976 was used until 1980 when the new blue with yellow wheat plate was introduced. The new plates were given at renewal time for all motorists to replace their old ones.		A/B C12345	Coded by county of issuance (A/B) and month of expiration (C)	
	Kansas	The new plates contained an embossed white serial on blue plate; yellow wheat stalk graphic screened at left and "KANSAS" screened in yellow centered at top		A/B C12345	Coded by county of issuance (A/B) and month of expiration (C)	Awarded "Plate of the Year" for best new license plate of 1980 by the Automobile License Plate Collectors Association, the first time Kansas was so honored. Discontinued due to legibility issues in 1982, but were revalidated with stickers until 1988.
	Kentucky					
	Louisiana					
	Maine					
	Maryland					
	Massachusetts					
	Michigan					
	Minnesota					
	Mississippi					
	Missouri					
	Montana					
	Nebraska					
	Nevada					
	New Hampshire					
	New Jersey					
	New Mexico					
	New York					
	North Carolina					
	North Dakota					
	Northern Mariana; Islands					
	Ohio					
	Oklahoma					
	Oregon					
	Pennsylvania					
	Puerto Rico					
	Rhode Island					
	South Carolina					
	South Dakota					
	Tennessee					
	Texas					
	Utah					
	Vermont					
	Virginia	Embossed dark blue serial on reflective white plate with border line; "Virginia" screened in blue centered at top.	None	ABC-123		Still currently revalidated.
	Washington					
	West Virginia	Embossed dark blue numbers on reflective white plate; yellow state shape with blue outline screened at left behind numbers; "WEST VIRGINIA" screened in dark blue centered at bottom.	Dark blue bar screened at top with "Wild, Wonderful" in white in the center			
	Wisconsin	Embossed black serial on reflective yellow plate; "WISCONSIN" at bottom, slogan at top; month of expiration at bottom left, debossed "80" at bottom right	AMERICA'S DAIRYLAND	A12-345; AB 1234	Coded by weight class (A)	
	Wyoming					

== Non-passenger plates ==
Non-passenger plates
Image (standard)	Region	Type	Design and slogan	Serial format	Serials issued	Notes
	Maine	Trailer	Embossed black serial on reflective white plate with border line; "MAINE 74" at top offset to left, "TRAILER" at bottom	123-456	1 to approximately 125-000, 150-001 to 205-000	Revalidated for 1980 with white on dark green stickers.
	Maine	Trailer	Embossed black serial on reflective white plate with border line; "MAINE 74" at top, "TRAILER" at bottom	123-456	125-001 to approximately 150-000	Revalidated for 1980 with white on dark green stickers.
	Maine	Trailer	Embossed black serial on reflective white plate with border line; "MAINE" at top left, "TRAILER" at bottom	123-456	205-001 to approximately 362-000	Revalidated for 1980 with white on dark green stickers.
	Maine	Trailer	Embossed black serial on reflective white plate with border line; "MAINE" at top, "TRAILER" at bottom	123-456	362-001 to approximately 599-999	Revalidated for 1980 with white on dark green stickers.
	Oregon	Utility trailer	Blue characters on orange background; No slogan	U123456	U00001? to approximately U035000	Revalidated for 1980 with white on red stickers
	Wisconsin	Private semi-trailer	Embossed white serial on light blue plate; "WISCONSIN" at bottom, "SEMI TRAILER" at top; debossed "80" at bottom right	P/C12345	P/C 1 to approximately P/C22000	

== See also ==
- Antique vehicle registration
- Electronic license plate
- Motor vehicle registration
- Vehicle license
