= Washington DC Sports Hall of Fame =

Hall of fame for Washington, D.C. sportspeople

The Washington DC Sports Hall of Fame is a hall of fame celebrating sportspeople in the Washington, D.C. area. It is located in left field of Nationals Park and was established in 1980 as the Washington Hall of Stars at the former RFK Stadium.

Nominees for inclusion, as determined by a selection committee, "must have gained prominence in the Washington area through their achievements in sports as an athlete, coach, owner, executive, member of the media or contributor." Washington Redskins founding owner George Preston Marshall was removed in 2020 due to his alleged racism.

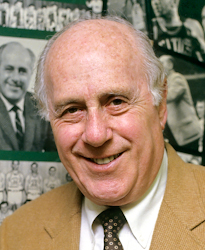
Red Auerbach

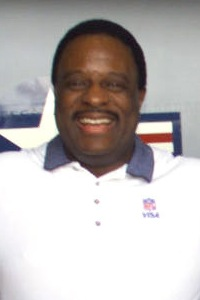
James Brown

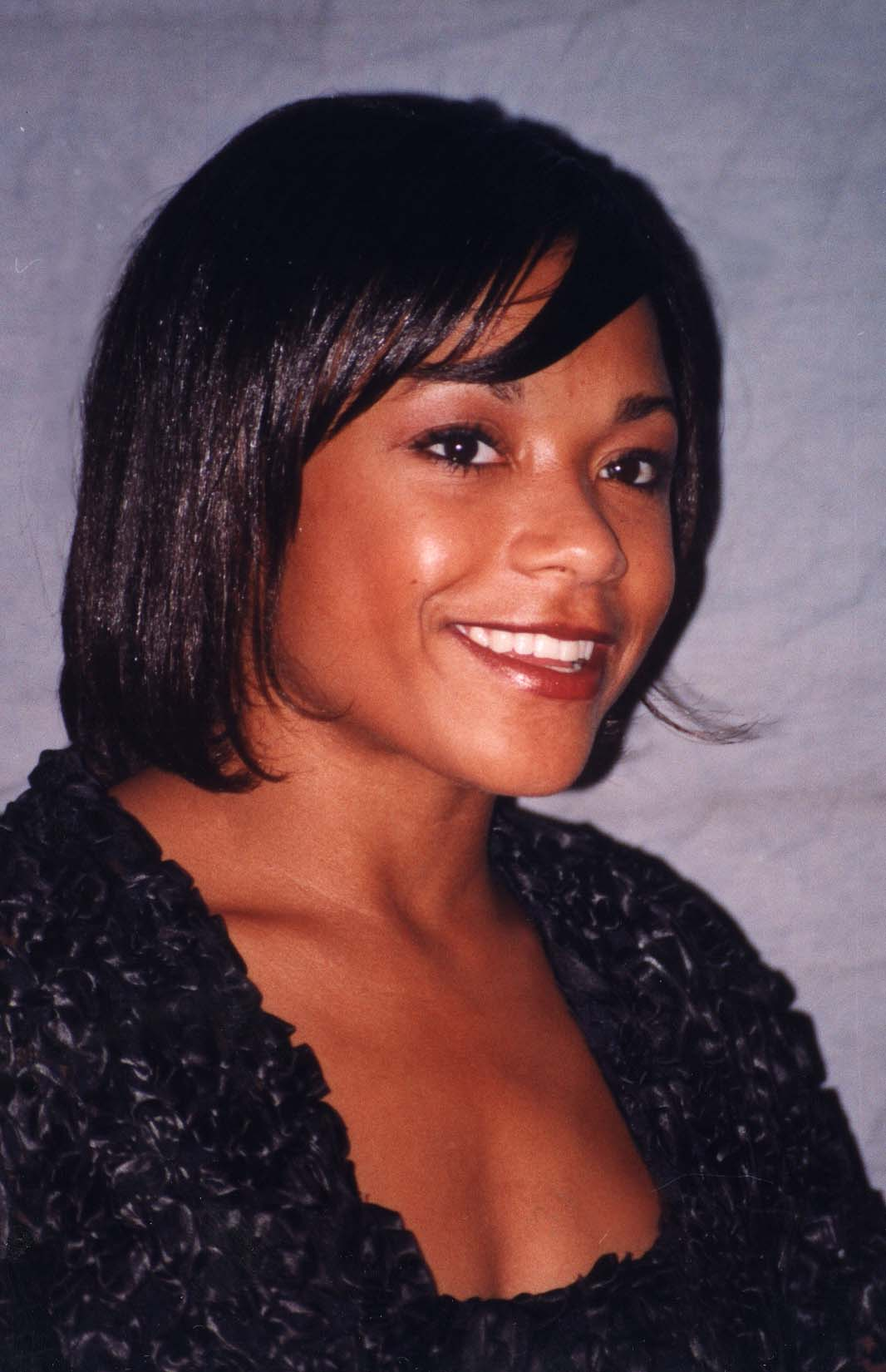
Dominique Dawes

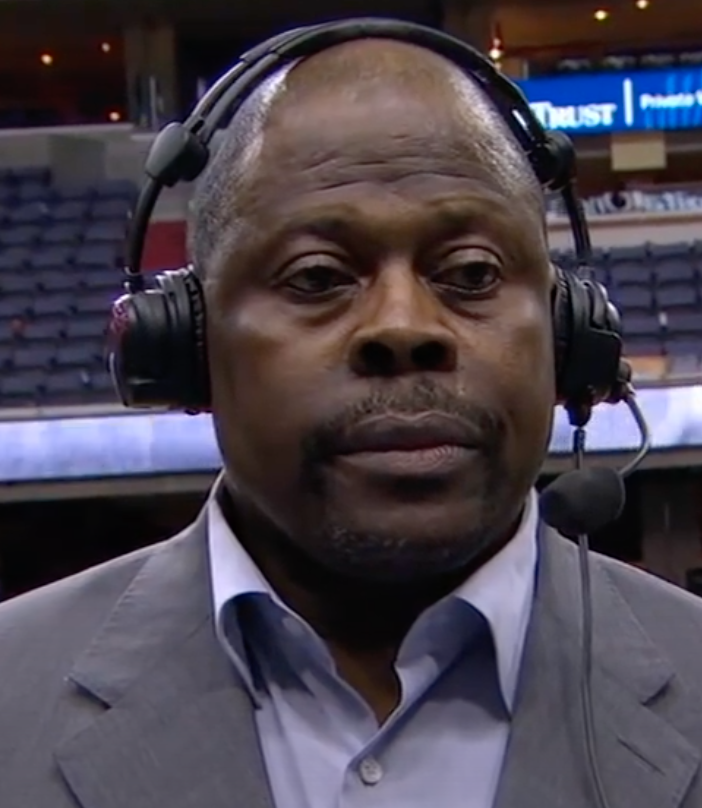
Patrick Ewing

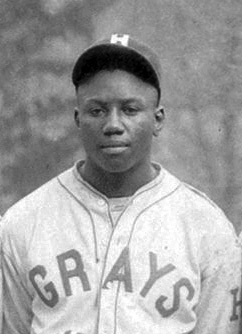
Josh Gibson

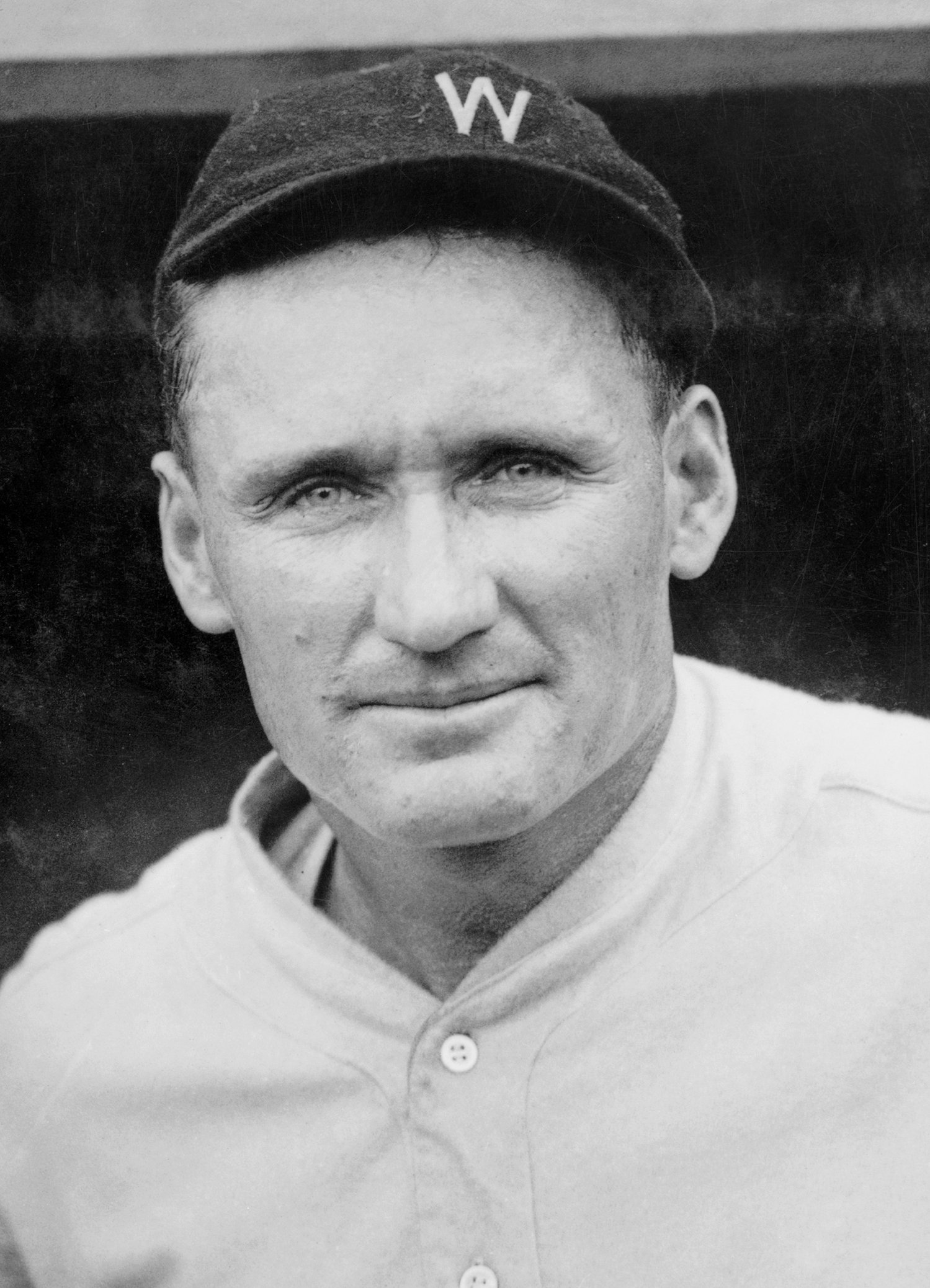
Walter Johnson

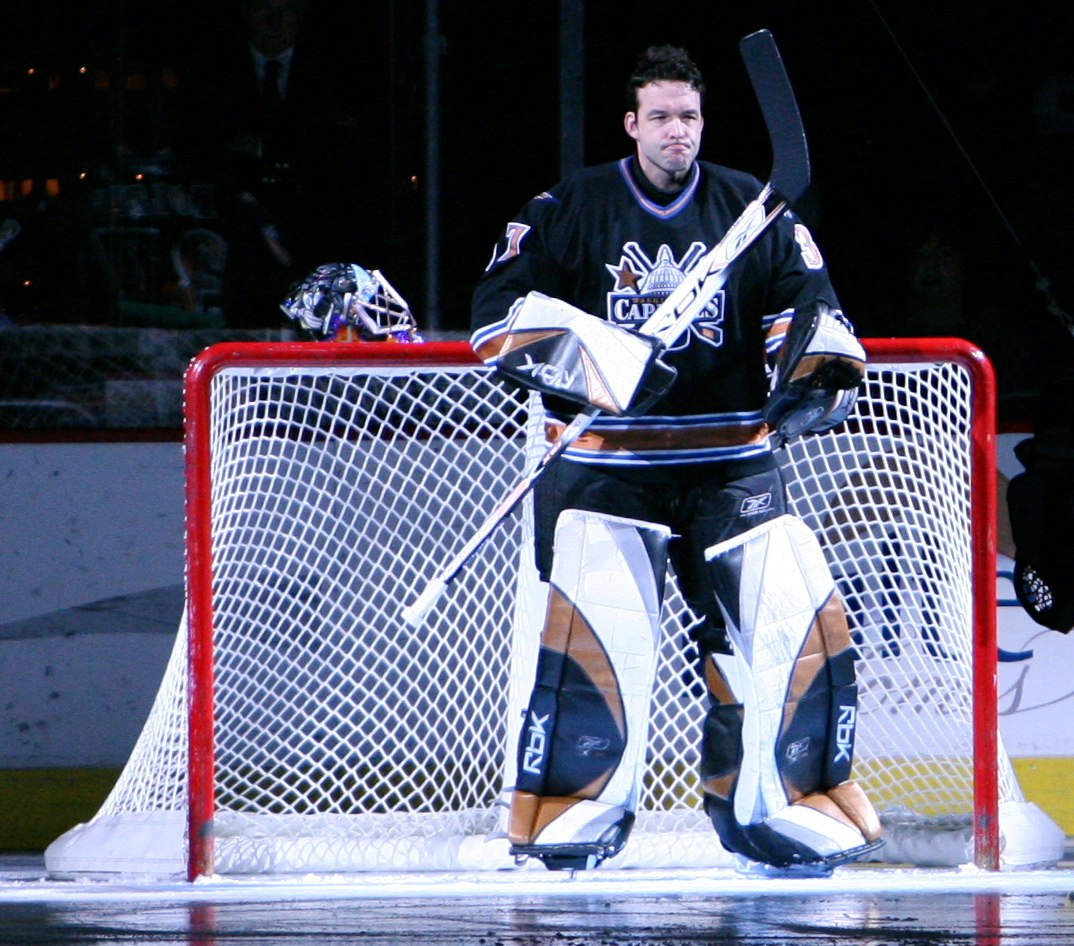
Olaf Kolzig

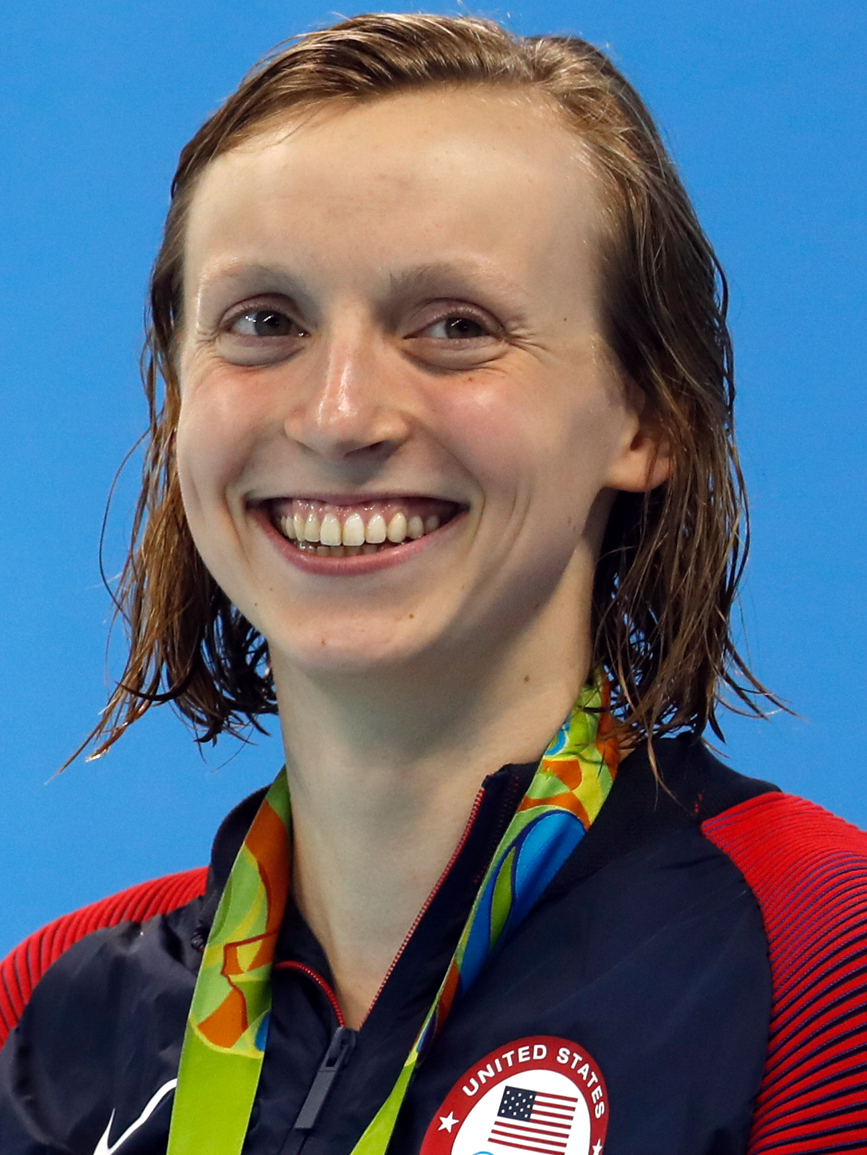
Katie Ledecky

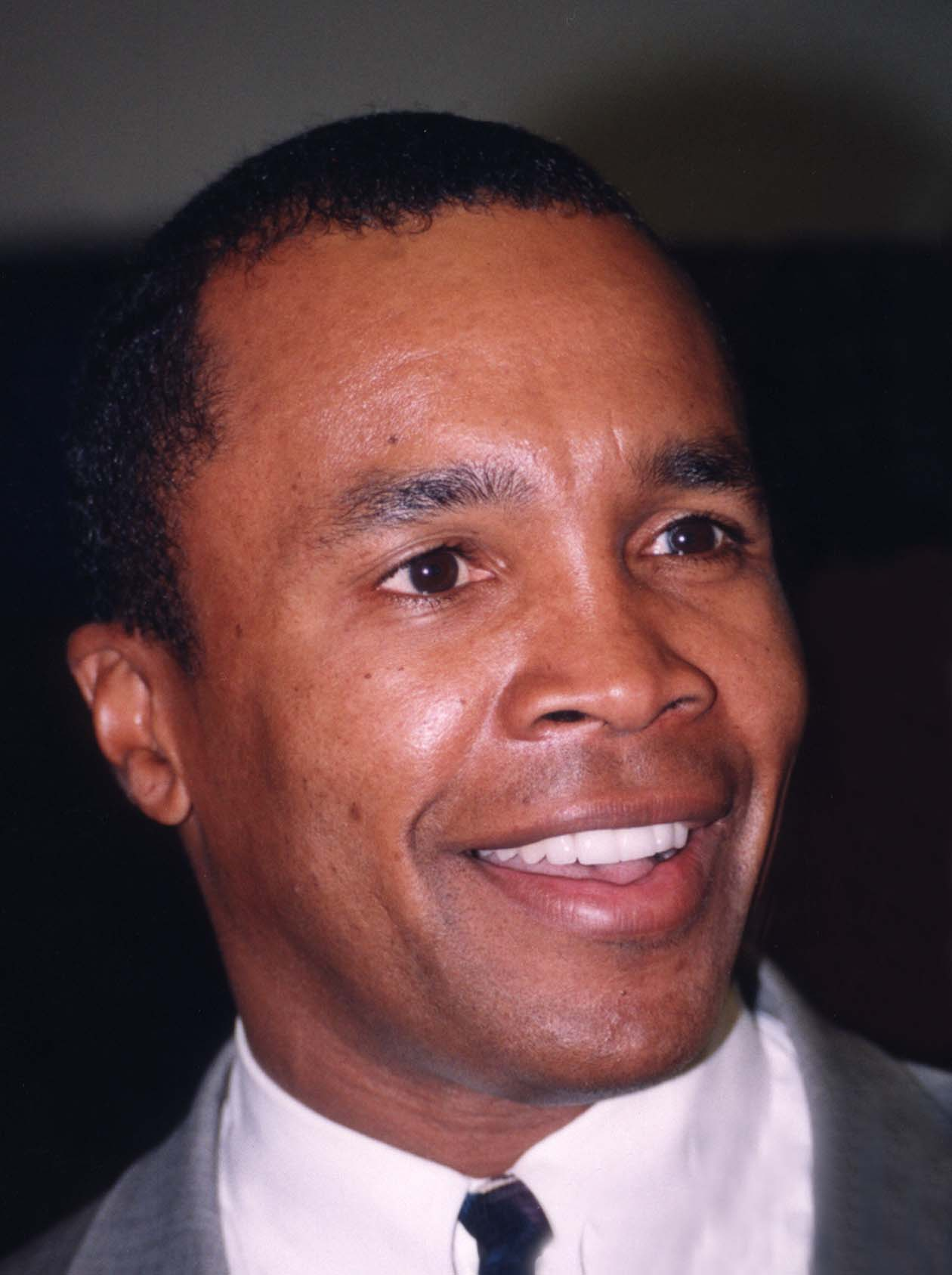
Sugar Ray Leonard

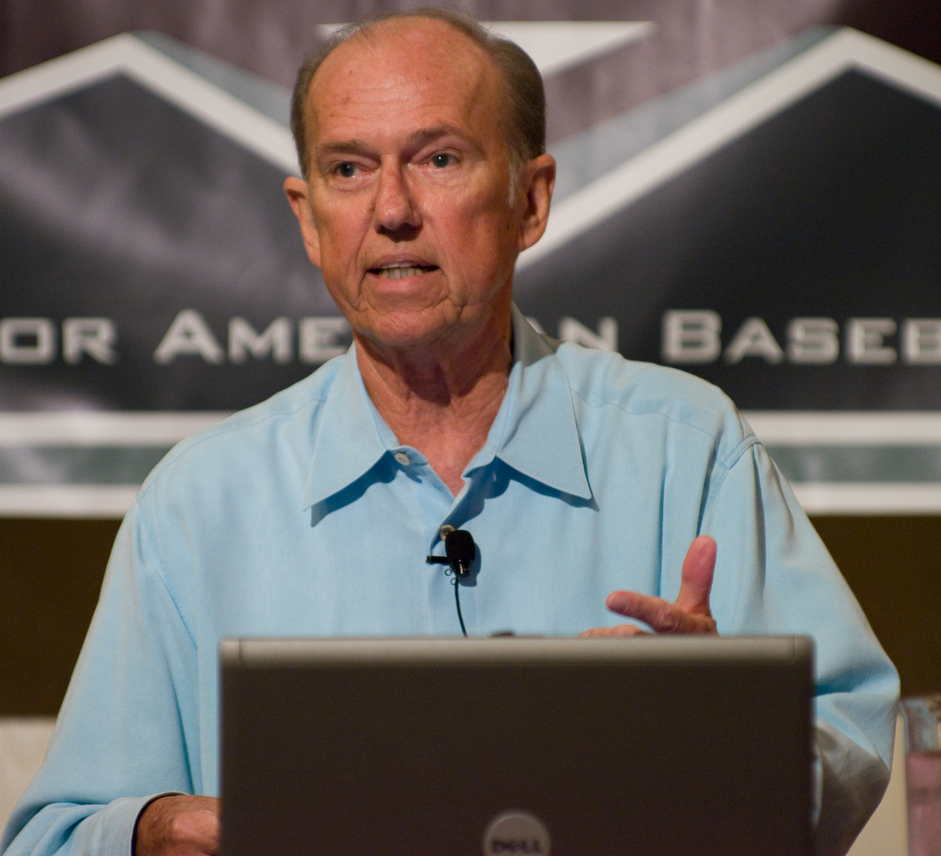
George Michael

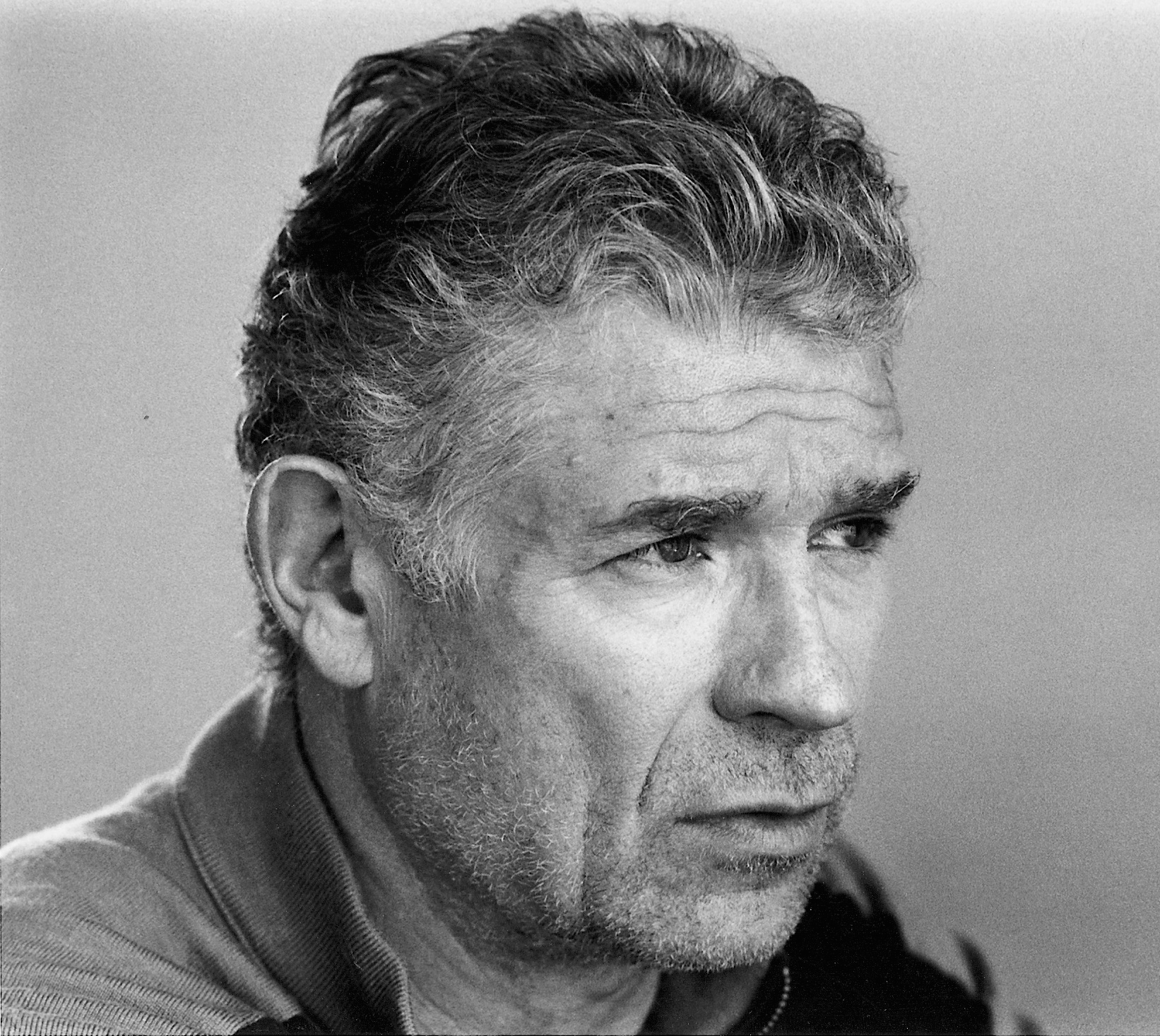
John Riggins

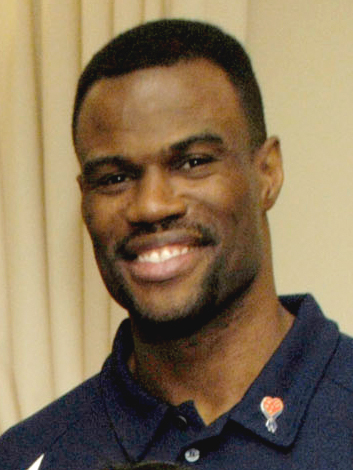
David Robinson

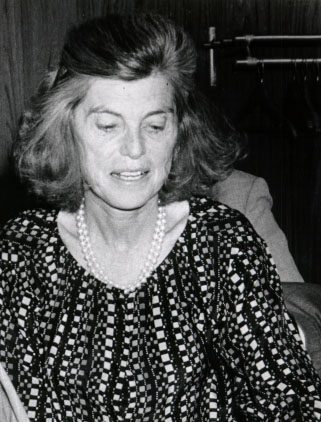
Eunice Kennedy Shriver

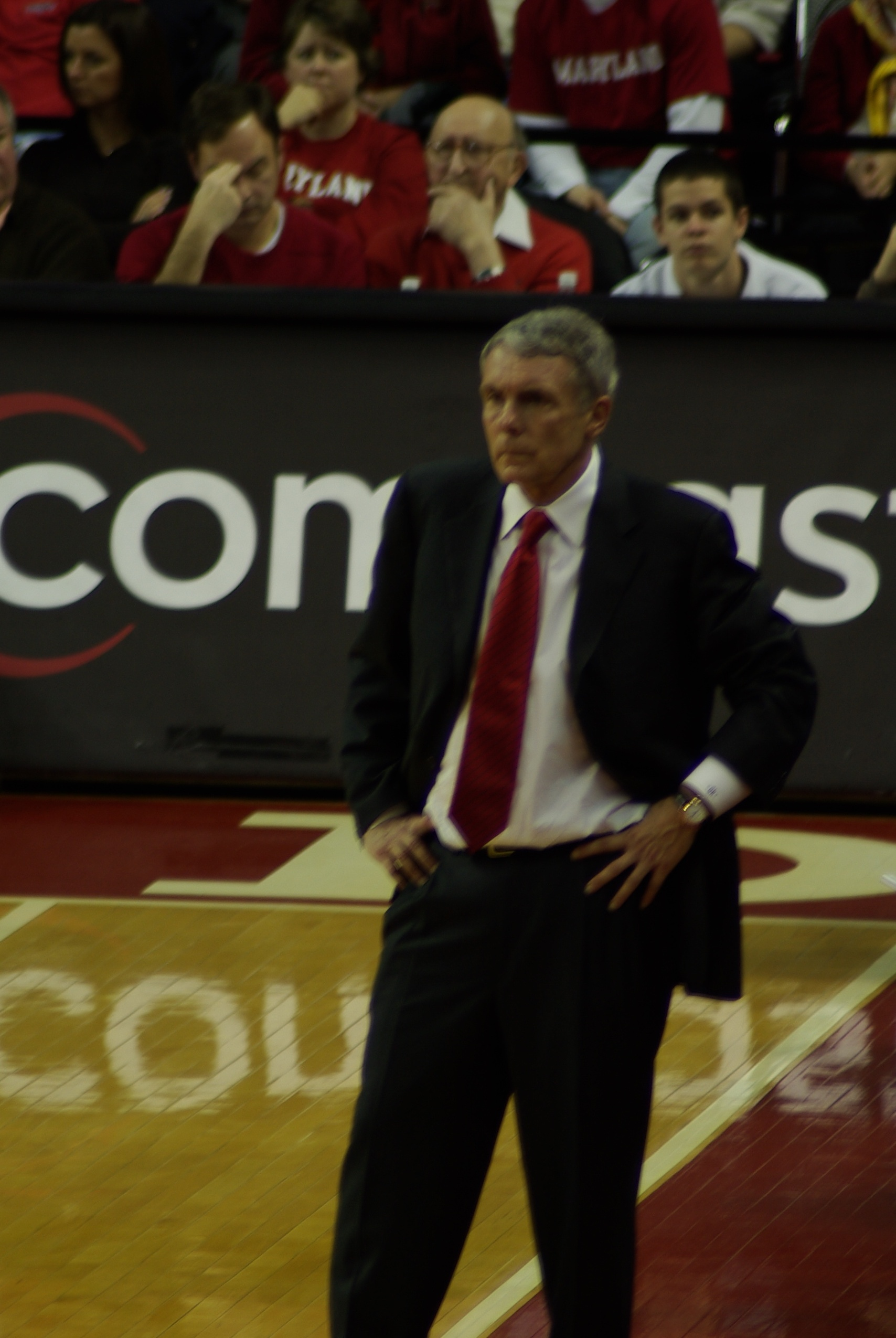
Gary Williams

== Hall of fame list ==
Name	Sport	Year Inducted
Jen Adams	Lacrosse	2023
Pauline Betz Addie	Tennis	Pre-2011
George Allen	Football	Pre-2011
Marty Aronoff	Broadcasting	2018
Arnold “Red” Auerbach	Basketball	1980
Mike Barrowman	Swimming	2021
Cliff Battles	Football	Pre-2011
Sammy Baugh	Football	1980
Elgin Baylor	Basketball	2013
Bobby Beathard	Football	2013
Ken Beatrice	Broadcasting	2020
James Thomas “Cool Papa” Bell	Baseball	2015
Melissa Belote	Swimming	Pre-2011
Deane Beman	Golf	Pre-2011
Arthur “Dutch” Bergman	Football	Pre-2011
Andrew Beyer	Sportswriting	2019
Len Bias	Basketball	2018
Dave Bing	Basketball	2013
Ossie Bluege	Baseball	Pre-2011
Peter Bondra	Hockey	2018
Herman Boone	Football	2020
Tom Boswell	Sportswriting	2015
Gordon Bradley	Soccer	Pre-2011
Christine Brennan	Broadcasting	2016
Glenn Brenner	Broadcasting	2012
Gene Brito	Football	Pre-2011
Charlie Brotman	Broadcasting	Pre-2011
James Brown	Broadcasting	2011
Larry Brown	Football	Pre-2011
Tom Brown	Football	2019
Steve Buckhantz	Broadcasting	2018
Dave Butz	Football	Pre-2011
Austin Carr	Basketball	2020
George Case	Baseball	Pre-2011
Charley Casserly	Football	2024
James “Ted” Chambers	Lacrosse	Pre-2011
Phil Chenier	Basketball	Pre-2011
Sasho Cirovski	Soccer	2019
Gary Clark	Football	2020
Maurice “Maus” Collins	Football	2013
Jack Kent Cooke	Football	Pre-2011
Joe Cronin	Baseball	Pre-2011
Adrian Dantley	Basketball	2012
Dominique Dawes	Gymnastics	2011
Donald Dell	Tennis	Pre-2011
Juan Dixon	Basketball	2017
Tom Dolan	Swimming	2019
Charles “Lefty” Driesell	Basketball	2014
Bill Dudley	Football	Pre-2011
Bob Dwyer	Basketball	2020
Lee Elder	Golf	Pre-2011
Jill Ellis	Soccer	2020
Len Elmore	Basketball	2022
Marco Etcheverry	Soccer	2016
Patrick Ewing	Basketball	2016
John Feinstein	Sportswriting	2021
Bob Ferry	Basketball	Pre-2011
Danny Ferry	Basketball	2019
Pat Fischer	Football	Pre-2011
Ray Flaherty	Football	2019
Len Ford	Football	2015
Bobby Foster	Boxing	Pre-2011
Brenda Frese	Basketball	2017
Ralph Friedgen	Football	2023
Joe Gallagher	Basketball	2012
Marty Gallagher	Boxing	Pre-2011
Mike Gartner	Hockey	2013
Bob Geoghan	Basketball	2022
Jim Gibbons	Broadcasting	Pre-2011
Joe Gibbs	Football	Pre-2011
Josh Gibson	Baseball	1980
Leon “Goose” Goslin	Baseball	Pre-2011
Darrell Green	Football	2012
Clark Griffith	Baseball	1980
Russ Grimm	Football	Pre-2011
Chris Hanburger	Football	Pre-2011
Glenn Harris	Broadcasting	2017
Stanley “Bucky” Harris	Baseball	Pre-2011
Len Hauss	Football	Pre-2011
Elvin Hayes	Basketball	Pre-2011
Neal Henderson	Hockey	2021
Frank Herzog	Football	2016
Grant Hill	Basketball	2018
Chuck Hinton	Baseball	Pre-2011
Phil Hochberg	Broadcasting	2013
Gil Hodges	Baseball	Pre-2011
Johnny Holliday	Broadcasting	2014
Ken Houston	Football	Pre-2011
Frank Howard	Baseball	Pre-2011
Sam Huff	Football	Pre-2011
Joe Jacoby	Football	Pre-2011
Dick James	Football	Pre-2011
Sally Jenkins	Sportswriting	2021
Mark "Too Sharp” Johnson	Boxing	2022
Walter Johnson	Baseball	1980
Wil Jones	Basketball	2020
Joe Judge	Baseball	1980
Sonny Jurgensen	Football	Pre-2011
Charlie “Choo-Choo” Justice	Football	Pre-2011
Harmon Killebrew	Baseball	Pre-2011
Billy Kilmer	Football	Pre-2011
Olaf Kolzig	Hockey	2014
Tony Kornheiser	Sportswriting	2017
Sam Lacy	Sportswriting	2012
Rod Langway	Hockey	Pre-2011
Eddie LeBaron	Football	Pre-2011
Katie Ledecky	Swimming	2017
Sugar Ray Leonard	Boxing	Pre-2011
Walter “Buck” Leonard	Baseball	Pre-2011
Ted Leonsis	Hockey, Basketball	2015
Mark Lerner	Baseball	2022
Ted Lerner	Baseball	2014
Earl Lloyd	Basketball	2016
Vince Lombardi	Football	Pre-2011
John Lucas	Basketball	2020
Lew Luce	Football	2023
Steve Mamakos	Boxing	Pre-2011
Dexter Manley	Football	2016
Charles Mann	Football	Pre-2011
Fred “Firpo” Marberry	Baseball	2021
Horace “Bones” McKinney	Basketball	Pre-2011
Tom McMillen	Basketball	2017
Missy Meharg	Field Hockey	2016
George Michael	Broadcasting	2013
Wayne Millner	Football	Pre-2011
Bob Milloy	Football	2016
Holley Mims	Boxing	Pre-2011
Bobby Mitchell	Football	Pre-2011
Brian Mitchell	Football	2011
Art Monk	Football	Pre-2011
Jaime Moreno	Soccer	2018
Mark Moseley	Football	Pre-2011
Dick Motta	Football	2021
Bryan Murray	Hockey	2015
Buddy Myer	Baseball	2018
Mike Nelms	Football	2017
Ken Niumatalolo	Football	2023
Brig Owens	Football	Pre-2011
Kevin Payne	Soccer	2019
Hyman Perlo	Basketball	2016
Phil Perlo	Football	2016
Richie Petitbon	Football	2015
David Poile	Hockey	2018
Abe Pollin	Basketball	Pre-2011
Shirley Povich	Sportswriting	Pre-2011
Vince Promuto	Football	Pre-2011
Paul Rabil	Lacrosse	2021
Cathy Reese	Lacrosse	2019
Sam Rice	Baseball	2013
John Riggins	Football	Pre-2011
Allie Ritzenberg	Tennis	2019
David Robinson	Basketball	2015
Eleni Rossides	Tennis	2018
George Selkirk	Baseball	Pre-2011
Eunice Kennedy Shriver	Special Olympics	2015
Morris “Mo” Siegel	Sportswriting	Pre-2011
Roy Sievers	Baseball	Pre-2011
Jerry Smith	Football	Pre-2011
George Solomon	Sportswriting	2014
Harold Solomon	Tennis	2016
Willie Stewart	Football	2011
Bessie Stockard	Basketball	2012
Paul Tagliabue	Football	2017
Charley Taylor	Football	Pre-2011
Joe Theismann	Football	Pre-2011
John Thompson, Jr	Basketball	2015
Cecil Travis	Baseball	Pre-2011
Wes Unseld	Basketball	Pre-2011
Mickey Vernon	Baseball	Pre-2011
Alan Webb	Track	2022
Ron Weber	Broadcasting	2017
Michael Weiss	Figure Skating	2014
Chris Weller	Basketball	2014
Marty West	Golf	2023
Guy Harris “Doc” White	Baseball	2015
Michael Wilbon	Sportswriting	2011
Dave Williams	Broadcasting	Pre-2011
Doug Williams	Football	Pre-2011
Edward Bennett Williams	Football	Pre-2011
Gary Williams	Basketball	2015
Walt Williams	Basketball	2018
Maury Wills	Baseball	2015
Christy Winters Scott	Basketball	2022
Warner Wolf	Broadcasting	2015
Bob Wolff	Broadcasting	2013
Willie Wood	Football	2013
Morgan Wootten	Basketball	2011
Raymond “Sonny” Workman	Hockey	Pre-2011
Early Wynn	Baseball	Pre-2011
Ed Yost	Baseball	Pre-2011
London Fletcher	Football	2026
Tommy Amaker	Basketball	2026
Elana Meyers Taylor	Bobsleigh	2026
Elena Delle Donne	Basketball	2026

== Teams of distinction ==
Name	Sport	Year Inducted
2017–18 Washington Capitals	Hockey	2019
2019 Washington Mystics	Basketball	2020
2019 Washington Nationals	Baseball	2020
2021 Washington Spirit	Soccer	2022
