= Bessie Stockard =

American tennis player

Bessie Ann Frances Stockard is an American tennis player and women's basketball coach.

Bessie Stockard grew up in Nashville, Tennessee, the youngest of seven children of Andy R. Stockard, a custodian, and Bessie Mae Morgan Stockard, a teacher. Her brother was sportswriter R. L. Stockard..

In high school, she began playing basketball and paddle tennis. She earned a basketball scholarship to Tuskegee University, graduating in 1955. Stockard became known for her paddle tennis in Nashville, but inspired by a local tennis champion, Wilitta Bartley, Stockard began playing with a racket purchased by her father on layaway. Eventually, Stockard became skilled enough to defeat Bartley in the Nashville City Parks tennis championship her freshman year of college.

Stockard played in the American Tennis Association for over a decade, winning 12 ATA national titles. She also played in the professional Virginia Slims Circuit from 1971 to 1974 and was its only African-American player at the time.

Stockard was hired by the newly created Federal City College in Washington DC to coach cheerleaders and majorettes. In the fall of 1969, she created the Federal City Pantherettes women's basketball team with no funding, gymnasium, or uniforms. The players used donated shirts and practiced in local high school gyms. Initially they were unable to find college teams willing to play against them, so they played against mostly amateur league teams, earning a 12–6 record. They were invited to the Amateur Athletic Union national tournament, where they were eliminated in the first round.

Over the next several years, the Pantherettes's reputation grew as they played well against teams in the Association for Intercollegiate Athletics for Women and the Metropolitan Intercollegiate Sports Association for Women. Stockard became known for her stylish hats and had the team dress in matching off-court clothes. Several polls had them ranked number one nationally. Despite this, in the 1975 AIAW women's basketball tournament, they were seeded against another tournament favorite, Delta State. Federal City lost to Delta State 77–75 in overtime. Delta State went on to win the tournament, while Federal City was eliminated from the consolation bracket in the third round by Wayland Baptist, 67–46. Several of the Federal City players went on to play in the Women's Professional Basketball League, but one of the team's star players, Jennifer Mitchell, died young at age 22.

Despite the success of the team, Stockard was ousted by a new athletic director before the 1976–77 season, prompting a number of her players to quit the team. Stockard served as an assistant coach on the United States women's basketball team during the 1976 Summer Olympics. In the fall she began coaching at American University, but was dismissed two years later because she was not teaching at the school. She was rehired in 1979 by the University of the District of Columbia, Federal City's successor institution, posting a 21-5 and 19–6 record over the next two seasons. A conflict with a different athletics director resulted in her firing two years later, but she Stockard sued, charging sex discrimination and false accusations of misappropriation of funds. She was reinstated by court order in October 1982, but fired a third time in April 1983.

Stockard was inducted into the Tuskegee University Athletic Hall of Fame in 1993, the Washington DC Sports Hall of Fame in 2012, the Black Tennis Hall of Fame in 2013, and the University of the District of Columbia Athletics Hall of Fame in 2016.

== Coaching record ==
Record table
Season	Team	Overall
District of Columbia Firebirds women's basketball () (–present)
1982-83	DC	17-7
1983-84	DC	16-9
1997-98	DC	4-19
District of Columbia Firebirds women's volleyball () (–present)
2003-04	DC	0-13
2008-09	DC	4-11
Total:		{{{overall}}}
National champion Postseason invitational champion Conference regular season champion Conference regular season and conference tournament champion Division regular season champion Division regular season and conference tournament champion Conference tournament champion
