= District of Columbia Department of Motor Vehicles =

DC government agency

- DC DMV logo

Agency overview
- Formed: 1955
- Jurisdiction: District of Columbia
- Headquarters: Washington, D.C.
- Employees: 333
- Annual budget: $72,384,773 (FY 2025)
- Agency executive: Gabriel Robinson, Director
- Website: dmv.dc.gov

The District of Columbia Department of Motor Vehicles (DC DMV) is an agency of the government of the District of Columbia, in the United States. The department registers motor vehicles and issues driver licenses (including commercial driver's licenses) and license plates, issues identification cards, and provides hearings on tickets (parking, moving violations, and major violations like DUIs).

== Overview ==
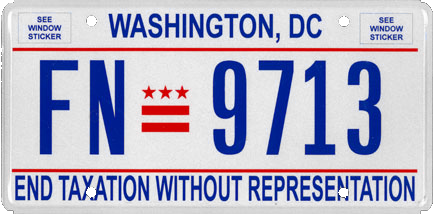
District of Columbia License Plate, c. 2017

The DC DMV was established in 1955, succeeding the Department of Vehicles and Traffic which had been formed in 1953. The agency is led by an agency director who is appointed by the Mayor of the District of Columbia. The mission of the DC DMV is to "promote the safe operation of motor vehicles and public safety, while providing outstanding customer service." The DC DMV has three operational divisions: Ticket Services, Driver Services, and Vehicle Services.

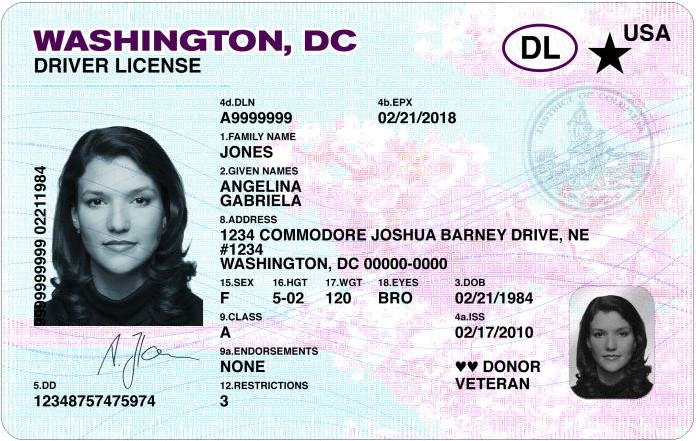
Sample District of Columbia Driver's License, c. 2018

The standard District of Columbia license plate issued by DC DMV includes the slogan, "End Taxation Without Representation" in support of the cause of DC Statehood.

As of 2022, the District of Columbia has 623,000 licensed drivers and 310,000 registered vehicles. The DMV also conducts over 178,000 vehicle inspections per year. Currently, the District of Columbia is home to more than 5,000 electric vehicles and approximately 250 public charging stations.

During Fiscal Year 2022, the DC DMV collected ticket payments for more than 2.7 million tickets and interacted with an average of 3,200 District of Columbia residents per day. In 2022, the DC DMV unveiled a virtual driver's test option.

Since 2019, the agency director of the DC DMV is Gabriel Robinson.

== See also ==
- Department of Motor Vehicles
- Vehicle registration plates of Washington, D.C.
