= Vehicle registration plates of Washington, D.C. =

Washington, D.C.
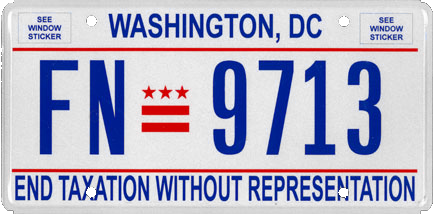

Current series
- Slogan: End Taxation Without Representation
- Size: 12 in × 6 in 30 cm × 15 cm
- Material: Aluminum
- Serial format: AB 1234
- Introduced: August 2017

Availability
- Issued by: District of Columbia Department of Motor Vehicles

History
- First issued: October 1, 1907

The U.S. federal district of Washington, D.C., first required its residents to register their motor vehicles in 1903. Registrants provided their own license plates for display until 1907, when the district began to issue plates. Plates are issued by the District of Columbia Department of Motor Vehicles (DC DMV). Front and rear plates are required for most classes of vehicles, while only rear plates are required for motorcycles and trailers.

== Passenger baseplates ==
=== 1907 to 1966 ===
In 1956, the United States, Canada, and Mexico came to an agreement with the American Association of Motor Vehicle Administrators, the Automobile Manufacturers Association and the National Safety Council that standardized the size for license plates for vehicles (except those for motorcycles) at 6 inches (15 cm) in height by 12 inches (30 cm) in width, with standardized mounting holes. The first Washington, D.C. license plate that complied with these standards was issued three years beforehand, in 1953 (dated March 31, 1954).

Image	Dates issued	Design	Slogan	Serial format	Serials issued	Notes
	1907–17	White serial on black porcelain plate; "DISTRICT OF COLUMBIA" at top	none	12345	1 to approximately 65000, with gaps	Some serial blocks believed to be reserved for motorcycles.
	1918	Embossed black serial on yellow plate; "DC 18" at right	none	12-345	1 to approximately 38-000	
	1919	Embossed white serial on green plate with border line; "D.C. 1919" at right	none	12-345	1 to approximately 46-000	
	1920	Embossed black serial on white plate with border line; "D.C. 1920" at right	none	12-345	1 to approximately 55-000	
	1921	Embossed blue serial on white plate with border line; "D.C. 1921" at right	none	12-345	1 to approximately 67-500	
	1922	Embossed white serial on red plate with border line; "D.C. 1922" at right	none	12-345	1 to approximately 80-000	
	1923	Embossed white serial on brown plate with border line; "D.C. 1923" at right	none	123-456	1 to approximately 112–000	
	1924	Embossed white serial on black plate with border line; "DIST. COL. 1924" centered at top	none	12-345	1 to approximately 91-000	
	1925	Embossed white serial on dark gray plate with border line; "DIST. COL. 1925" centered at top	none	123-456	1 to approximately 114–000	
	1926	Embossed black serial on orange plate with border line; "DIST. COL. 1926" centered at top	none	123-456	1 to approximately 112–000	
	1927	Embossed golden yellow serial on black plate with border line; "DIST. COL. 1927" centered at top	none	A-1234	E-1 to approximately V-1000	Letters A, B, C, D, H and R used on non-passenger vehicles. This practice continued through 1934.
	1928	Embossed black serial on golden yellow plate; "DIST. OF COLUMBIA - 1928" at bottom	none	A-1234	E-1 to approximately W-9000	
	1929	Embossed golden yellow serial on black plate; "DIST. OF COLUMBIA - 1929" at bottom	none	A-1234	E-1 to approximately Z-8000	
	1930	As 1928 base, but with "DIST. OF COLUMBIA - 1930" at bottom	none	A-1234	E-1 to approximately Y-3000	
	1931	As 1929 base, but with "DIST. OF COLUMBIA - 1931" at bottom	none	A-1234	E-1 to approximately Z-3000	
	1932	As 1928 base, but with "DIST. OF COLUMBIA - 1932" at bottom	none	A-1234	E-1 to approximately W-1000	
	1933	As 1929 base, but with "DIST. OF COLUMBIA - 1933" at bottom	none	A-1234	E-1 to approximately X-4000	
	1934	As 1928 base, but with "DIST. OF COLUMBIA - 1934" at bottom	none	A-1234	E-1 to approximately X-3000	
	1935	Embossed green serial on white plate with border line; "DISTRICT OF COLUMBIA - 1935" at bottom	none	123-456	57-001 to approximately 191–000	
	1936	Embossed black serial on golden yellow plate with border line; "DISTRICT OF COLUMBIA" and "1936" centered at top and bottom respectively	none	123-456	54-001 to approximately 202–000	
	1937	Embossed golden yellow serial on black plate with border line; "DISTRICT OF COLUMBIA" and "1937" centered at top and bottom respectively	none	123-456	46-001 to approximately 193–000	
	1938	Embossed black serial on golden yellow plate with border line; "1938" and "DISTRICT OF COLUMBIA" centered at top and bottom respectively	none	123-456	46-001 to approximately 182–000	
	January 1, 1939 – February 29, 1940	Embossed golden yellow serial on black plate with border line; "DISTRICT OF COLUMBIA" and "EX-2-29-40" centered at top and bottom respectively	none	123-456	46-001 to approximately 174–000	
	March 1, 1940 – March 31, 1941	Embossed black serial on golden yellow plate with border line; "DISTRICT OF COLUMBIA" and "EX-3-31-41" centered at top and bottom respectively	none	123-456	52-000 to approximately 182–000	
	April 1, 1941 – March 31, 1942	Embossed golden yellow serial on black plate with border line; "EX-3-31-42" and "DISTRICT OF COLUMBIA" centered at top and bottom respectively	none	123-456	46-001 to approximately 183–000	
	April 1, 1942 – March 31, 1945	As 1940–41 base, but with "EX-3-31-43" at bottom	none	123-456	52-001 to approximately 216–000	Revalidated through March 31, 1944, with black tabs, then through March 31, 1945, with white tabs, due to metal conservation for World War II.
	April 1, 1945 – March 31, 1946	As 1941–42 base, but with "EX-3-31-46" at top	none	123-456	45-001 to approximately 136–000	Only rear plates issued due to ongoing metal shortage.
	April 1, 1946 – March 31, 1948	As 1940–41 base, but with "EX-3-31-47" at bottom	none	123-456	50-001 to approximately 181–000	Revalidated through March 31, 1948, with white tabs.
	April 1, 1948 – March 31, 1949	Embossed golden yellow serial on black plate; "19 D.C. 48" at top	none	1234	1 to 9999	Letters B, C, D, H, L, M, R and T used on non-passenger vehicles. This practice continued through March 31, 1955.
	April 1, 1948 – March 31, 1949	Embossed golden yellow serial on black plate; "19 D.C. 48" at top	none	1-2345	1-1000 to 9-9999	Letters B, C, D, H, L, M, R and T used on non-passenger vehicles. This practice continued through March 31, 1955.
	April 1, 1948 – March 31, 1949	Embossed golden yellow serial on black plate; "19 D.C. 48" at top	none	A-1234	A-1 to approximately N-1000	Letters B, C, D, H, L, M, R and T used on non-passenger vehicles. This practice continued through March 31, 1955.
	April 1, 1949 – March 31, 1950	Embossed black serial on golden yellow plate; "19 D.C. 49" at bottom	none	1234	1 to 9999	
	April 1, 1949 – March 31, 1950	Embossed black serial on golden yellow plate; "19 D.C. 49" at bottom	none	1-2345	1-1000 to 9-9999	
	April 1, 1949 – March 31, 1950	Embossed black serial on golden yellow plate; "19 D.C. 49" at bottom	none	A-1234	A-1 to approximately P-7000	
	April 1, 1950 – March 31, 1951	Embossed golden yellow serial on black plate with border line; "19 D.C. 50" at bottom	none	1234	1 to 9999	
	April 1, 1950 – March 31, 1951	Embossed golden yellow serial on black plate with border line; "19 D.C. 50" at bottom	none	1-2345	1-1000 to 9-9999	
	April 1, 1950 – March 31, 1951	Embossed golden yellow serial on black plate with border line; "19 D.C. 50" at bottom	none	A-1234	A-1 to approximately S-5000	
	April 1, 1951 – March 31, 1952	Embossed black serial on golden yellow plate with border line; "19 D.C. 51" at top	none	1234	1 to 9999	
	April 1, 1951 – March 31, 1952	Embossed black serial on golden yellow plate with border line; "19 D.C. 51" at top	none	1-2345	1-1000 to 9-9999	
	April 1, 1951 – March 31, 1952	Embossed black serial on golden yellow plate with border line; "19 D.C. 51" at top	none	A-1234	A-1 to approximately S-2000	
	April 1, 1952 – March 31, 1953	Embossed golden yellow serial on black plate with border line; "19 D.C. 52" at bottom	none	1234	1 to 9999	
	April 1, 1952 – March 31, 1953	Embossed golden yellow serial on black plate with border line; "19 D.C. 52" at bottom	none	1-2345	1-1000 to 9-9999	
	April 1, 1952 – March 31, 1953	Embossed golden yellow serial on black plate with border line; "19 D.C. 52" at bottom	none	A-1234	A-1 to approximately P-1000	
	April 1, 1953 – March 31, 1955	Embossed dark green serial on white plate with border line; "DIST. OF COLUMBIA" centered at top; "3-31" at top left and "54" at top right	"THE NATION'S CAPITAL" centered at bottom	1234	1 to 9999	Revalidated through March 31, 1955, with dark green tabs.
	April 1, 1953 – March 31, 1955	Embossed dark green serial on white plate with border line; "DIST. OF COLUMBIA" centered at top; "3-31" at top left and "54" at top right	"THE NATION'S CAPITAL" centered at bottom	1-2345	1-1000 to 9-9999	Revalidated through March 31, 1955, with dark green tabs.
	April 1, 1953 – March 31, 1955	Embossed dark green serial on white plate with border line; "DIST. OF COLUMBIA" centered at top; "3-31" at top left and "54" at top right	"THE NATION'S CAPITAL" centered at bottom	A-1234	A-1 to Z-9999	Revalidated through March 31, 1955, with dark green tabs.
	April 1, 1953 – March 31, 1955	Embossed dark green serial on white plate with border line; "DIST. OF COLUMBIA" centered at top; "3-31" at top left and "54" at top right	"THE NATION'S CAPITAL" centered at bottom	AB-123	AA-1 to approximately AB-999	Revalidated through March 31, 1955, with dark green tabs.
	April 1, 1955 – March 31, 1956	Embossed white serial on dark green plate with border line; "DISTRICT OF COLUMBIA" centered at bottom; "3-31" at top left and "56" at top right	"NATION'S CAPITAL" centered at top	AB♦12♦34	AA♦10♦00 to AY♦99♦99; EA♦10♦00 to approximately EA♦99♦99	Serials with B, C, D, H and L as the first letter used on non-passenger vehicles. This practice continued through March 31, 1964.
	April 1, 1956 – March 31, 1957	Embossed black serial on golden yellow plate with border line; "DISTRICT OF COLUMBIA" centered at bottom; "3-31" at top left and "57" at top right	"NATION'S CAPITAL" centered at top	AB♦12♦34	AA♦10♦00 to AY♦99♦99; EA♦10♦00 to approximately EA♦99♦99	
	April 1, 1957 – March 31, 1958	Embossed golden yellow serial on royal blue plate with border line; "DISTRICT OF COLUMBIA" centered at bottom; "3-31" at top left and "58" at top right	"NATION'S CAPITAL" centered at top	AB♦123	AA♦100 to approximately SZ♦999	
	April 1, 1958 – March 31, 1959	Embossed royal blue serial on golden yellow plate with border line; "DISTRICT OF COLUMBIA" centered at bottom; "3-31" at top left and "59" at top right	"NATION'S CAPITAL" centered at top	AB♦123	AA♦100 to approximately WB♦999	
	April 1, 1959 – March 31, 1960	As 1957–58 base, but with "60" at top right	"NATION'S CAPITAL" centered at top	AB♦123	AA♦100 to approximately WK♦999	
	April 1, 1960 – March 31, 1961	As 1958–59 base, but with "61" at top right	"NATION'S CAPITAL" centered at top	AB♦123	AA♦100 to approximately WP♦999	
	April 1, 1961 – March 31, 1962	As 1957–58 base, but with "62" at top right	"NATION'S CAPITAL" centered at top	AB♦123	AA♦100 to approximately WV♦999	
	April 1, 1962 – March 31, 1963	Embossed dark green serial on reflective white plate with border line; "DISTRICT OF COLUMBIA" centered at bottom; "3-31" at top left and "63" at top right	"NATION'S CAPITAL" centered at top	AB♦123	AA♦100 to approximately WV♦999	
	April 1, 1963 – March 31, 1964	Embossed black serial on reflective yellow plate with border line; "DISTRICT OF COLUMBIA" centered at bottom; "3-31" at top left and "64" at top right	"NATION'S CAPITAL" centered at top	AB♦123	AA♦100 to approximately XJ♦999	
	April 1, 1964 – March 31, 1965	Embossed red serial on reflective white plate with border line; "DISTRICT OF COLUMBIA" centered at bottom; "3-31" at top left and "65" at top right	"NATION'S CAPITAL" centered at top	1A234	1A101 to 9Z999	
	April 1, 1964 – March 31, 1965	Embossed red serial on reflective white plate with border line; "DISTRICT OF COLUMBIA" centered at bottom; "3-31" at top left and "65" at top right	"NATION'S CAPITAL" centered at top	1A23	1A01 to approximately 2T99	
	April 1, 1965 – March 31, 1966	Embossed black serial on reflective golden yellow plate with border line; "WASHINGTON, D.C." centered at bottom; "3-31" at top left and "66" at top right	"NATION'S CAPITAL" centered at top	1AB23	1AA01 to approximately 2MH99	

=== 1966 to present ===
Since November 2000, the standard Washington, D.C. license plate design has featured some form of the slogan "Taxation Without Representation", referring to the circumstance that the district's residents face, in common with U.S. territories, in which they must pay federal income tax but cannot elect a voting member of the United States Congress.

Image(s)	Dates issued	Design	Slogan	Serial format	Serials issued	Notes
	April 1, 1966 – March 31, 1967	Embossed black serial on reflective white plate with border line; "WASHINGTON, D.C." centered at top; "3-31" at bottom left and "67" at bottom right	"NATION'S CAPITAL" centered at bottom	123-456	100-001 to 300–000	Validated from April 1, 1967, through March 31, 1968, with stickers.
	April 1, 1967 – March 31, 1968	As above, but without "67"	"NATION'S CAPITAL" centered at bottom	123-456	300-001 to approximately 368–000	Validated from April 1, 1967, through March 31, 1968, with stickers.
	April 1, 1968 – March 31, 1974	Embossed black serial on reflective white plate with border line; "WASHINGTON, D.C." centered at bottom	"NATION'S CAPITAL" centered at top	123-456	500-001 to 999-999	
	April 1, 1974 – March 31, 1978	Embossed blue serial on reflective white plate; embossed blue U.S. Capitol dome graphic used as separator; screened red stripes above and below serial; "WASHINGTON, D.C." centered at bottom; "3-31" at bottom left and debossed sticker box at bottom right	"1776 BICENTENNIAL 1976" at top	123-456	100-001 to 500–000	Monthly staggered registration introduced August 1, 1983. All plates replaced between 1984 and 1986.
	April 1, 1978 – March 31, 1979	As above, but with "3-31" on sticker at bottom left (applied during production)	"NATION'S CAPITAL" centered at top	123-456	500-001 to 562–000	Monthly staggered registration introduced August 1, 1983. All plates replaced between 1984 and 1986.
	April 1, 1979 – September 1984	As above, but without "3-31" sticker	"NATION'S CAPITAL" centered at top	123-456	562-001 to 925–000	Monthly staggered registration introduced August 1, 1983. All plates replaced between 1984 and 1986.
	October 1984 – July; 1991	Embossed blue serial on reflective white plate; screened district flag used as separator; screened red stripes above and below serial; "Washington, D.C." screened in blue centered at bottom; debossed sticker boxes in bottom corners	"A Capital City" screened in blue centered at top	123-456	925-001 to 999-999; 010-001 to 501–750	Plates with all-numeric serials still validated including April 2016 all-numedic remake on the 2013 DISTRICT OF COLUMBIA base Slogan changed in 1991 in honor of the district's bicentennial.
	July 1991 – April; 1997	Embossed blue serial on reflective white plate; screened district flag used as separator; screened red stripes above and below serial; "Washington, D.C." screened in blue centered at bottom; debossed sticker boxes in bottom corners	"Celebrate & Discover" screened in blue centered at top	123-456	501-751 to approximately 853–000	Plates with all-numeric serials still validated including April 2016 all-numedic remake on the 2013 DISTRICT OF COLUMBIA base Slogan changed in 1991 in honor of the district's bicentennial.
	April; 1997 – November 2000	As above, but with "Washington, D.C." and sticker boxes at top rather than bottom	"Celebrate & Discover" as above, but at bottom	AB-1234	AA-0000 to AY-9999	AP series reserved for Apportioned plates.
	November 2000 – October 2001	As above, but with "Washington, D.C." and sticker boxes at top rather than bottom	"TAXATION WITHOUT REPRESENTATION" screened in blue at bottom	AB-1234	AZ-0000 to BA-9999; BC-0000 to approximately BG-1999	AP series reserved for Apportioned plates.
	January 2001 – January 2002	As above, but with "Washington, D.C." and sticker boxes at top rather than bottom	"WWW.Washingtondc.gov" screened in blue centered at bottom	AB-1234	BB-0000 to approximately BB-1999	Alternative issue.
	October 2001 – October 2002	As above, but with serial screened rather than embossed, and without debossed sticker boxes	"TAXATION WITHOUT REPRESENTATION" as above	AB-1234	BG-2000 to BH-9999; BK-0000 to approximately BP-1399	
	January 2002 – c. 2018	As above, but with serial screened rather than embossed, and without debossed sticker boxes	"www.washingtondc.gov" screened in blue centered at bottom	AB-1234	BJ-0000 to BJ-9999; EA-0000 to approximately EA-2999	Alternative issues. EA series began in mid-2010.
	c. 2018 – present	As above, but with serial screened rather than embossed, and without debossed sticker boxes	"www.dc.gov" screened in blue centered at bottom	AB-1234	EA-3000 to present	Alternative issues. EA series began in mid-2010.
	October 2002 – July; 2013	As above, but with "WASHINGTON, DC" in blue at top	"TAXATION WITHOUT REPRESENTATION" as above	AB-1234	BP-1400 to DZ-9999; EB-0000 to EJ-9999	DC series reserved for D.C. Government Fleet plates.
	July; 2013 – August; 2017	As above, but with "DISTRICT OF COLUMBIA" in blue at top	"TAXATION WITHOUT REPRESENTATION" as above	AB-1234	EK-0000 to FN-3999 also all-numeric remakes (000-000 format) from the 1984 A Capital City & 1991 Celebrate & Discover bases	DC series reserved for D.C. Government Fleet plates.
	August; 2017 – present	As above, but with "WASHINGTON, DC" at top as from 2002 to 2013	"END TAXATION WITHOUT REPRESENTATION" screened in blue at bottom	AB-1234	FN-4000 to GV-9999; JA-0000 to JX-7377 (as of September 2, 2026)	DC series reserved for D.C. Government Fleet plates.

== Non-passenger plates ==
Image	Type	Dates issued	Design	Serial format	Notes
	Annual Special Permit	c. 1971–present; undated prior to 1980	Annual plates; unique design each year: 1980: yellow on red 1981: red on yellow 1982: white on green 1983: black on yellow 1984: yellow on blue 1986: black on white 1987: white on green 1988: white on red 1990: yellow on red 1991: red on yellow 1991: yellow on red 2008: black on orange 2009: black on blue 2010: white on green 2011: black on magenta 2012: white on black 2013: black on white 2014: black on orange 2015: black on dark yellow 2016: white on dark blue 2017: black on lemon yellow 2018: black on red 2019: black on gray 2020: black on dark yellow 2021: black on green (expiration extended to 2022 with stickers); 2023: orange on white 2024: black on green 2025: buff on light blue	1234-65; TC-1234; TT-1234 (Note: The flag of the District of Columbia is used as a serial divider.)	Temporary-use permits supplemental to registration plates; issued to heavy trucks registered outside of D.C.
	Apportioned	c. 2000–present	As passenger base, with district flag used as separator in serial, but with "APPORTIONED" in place of slogan	AP-1234	Infrequently issued. Validated with plate stickers, as opposed to windshield stickers. Current highest serial seen: AP-1396 (on October 28, 2021).
	Bus	1927–present	As passenger base, with district flag used as separator in serial	B-12345	Current serial sequence began 1974 at B-101; serials became screened at around B-40500. Current highest serial seen: B-52131 (on November 2, 2020).
	Clergy	1975-1984, with limited issuance since 1984	As 1984–91 passenger base, with "A Capital City" at top, but with district flag at left	CLERGY; 1234	Likely no longer manufactured, but still revalidated.
	Commercial	1926–present	As passenger base, with district flag used as separator in serial	C-12345	Current serial sequence began 1974 at C-101; serials became screened at around C-68000. Current highest serial seen: C-82000 (on June 3, 2021).
2013 2020 2021 2022	Dealer	1919–present	Generally issued on the same cycle as passenger plates until 2004, when annual plates with a unique design each year began.	DLR-1234	2005: white on red 2006: white on blue 2007: black on yellow 2008: black on pink 2009: black on teal 2010: white on light blue 2011: black on yellow 2012: white on dark green
2013 2020 2021 2022	Dealer	1919–present	Generally issued on the same cycle as passenger plates until 2004, when annual plates with a unique design each year began.	DLR12345	2013: black on blue 2014: black on maroon
2013 2020 2021 2022	Dealer	1919–present	Generally issued on the same cycle as passenger plates until 2004, when annual plates with a unique design each year began.	DLR-12345	2015: black on yellow 2016: black on grey 2017: black on green 2018: black on red 2019: black on orange 2020: black on blue 2021: black on pink 2022: black on yellow 2023: black on green 2024: unknown 2025: yellow on dark green
	Disabled	c. 1981–present	As passenger base, with no district flag	H/P12345; 12345	Serial sequence began at H/P001; the letters were dropped when the "Celebrate & Discover" slogan was introduced, at around 12000. Current highest serial seen: 26021 (on October 6, 2020).
	Foreign Organization	Beginning by at least 2003; discontinued by 2015	Similar to passenger base, but with plum blossom symbol at left	T/P/E1234	Issued to vehicles owned by official representatives of Taiwan. No longer issued.
	D.C. Government Fleet	1927–present	As passenger base, but with district flag at left with "D.C. GOVT." above and "Fleet" below	^{G}V_{T}1234; GT-1234; D/C 12345	Current serial sequence began 2000 at D/C 0001. Current highest serial seen: D/C 14350 (on June 3, 2022).
	D.C. Government Motorcycle	1952–present	5-digit plates: embossed blue on white; 6-digit plates: flat blue on white	GM-123; DC-1234; DC-123A	"GVT Motorcycle" legend
	District of Columbia Water and Sewer Authority	2001-2011; 2011–present		W/A/S/A1234; D/C/W1234	D.C. Water plates replaced WASA plates in October 2011.
	Historic Motor Vehicle	1979–present	White plate with Capitol dome and district flag at left. Screened blue serial letters and embossed red serial digits until 2006; full serial screened blue since	H/M/V1234	Issued to vehicles that are at least 25 years old. Serial sequence began at H/M/V1; serials became fully screened at around H/M/V900. Current highest serial seen: H/M/V3018 (on May 11, 2020).
	Livery	1974–present	As passenger base, with district flag used as separator in serial	L-1234	
	Manufacturer	2004-2011	Annual plates; unique design each year.	MFR-1234	
	Motorcycle	c. 1908/1912–present	M and MC series: blue on white Subsequent series: black on white	1234M; MC123^{M}_{T}1234^{M}_{R}1234^{M}_{C}1234^{M}_{X}1234^{M}_{Y} 1234	^{M}_{T} series began in 2002.^{M}_{R} series began in 2010 but was not issued to completion before^{M}_{C} series began in 2012.^{M}_{R} series later issued to completion.^{M}_{X} series began in 2019 but was not issued to completion before^{M}_{Y} series began in 2021.
	Motor-Driven Cycle	c. 2018–present	Black on white	M/D/C1234	
	Rental vehicle	1927-1954, 1964–present	As passenger base, with district flag used as separator in serial	R-12345	
	Solid Waste	c. 1980s	As passenger base, with district flag used as separator in serial	SW-123	Probably no longer issued.
	Taxi	c. 1920–present	As passenger base, with district flag used as separator in serial	H-12345; 12345-H	Current serial sequence began 1974 at H-101; serials became screened at around H-85500. H-99999 reached early 2011, followed by 00001-H onwards. Current highest serial seen: 05395-H (on February 26, 2022).
	Temporary registration	c. 1955–present	Orange-red on white cardboard.	12345DA; X 12345; Z 12345; K 12345; N 12345	X series began in 2001. Z series began in 2003. K series began in 2007. N series began in 2011.
	Temporary registration	c. 1955–present	Black on white paper	A1B2C3D4	Print-on-demand style began on September 30, 2024.
	Temporary registration — motorcycle	c. 2009–present	Black on white cardboard	MM 1234	
	Temporary registration issued by new car dealer	c. 2008–present	Pink on white cardboard.	12NC345	Issued only by Tesla, Inc. and Polestar since 2014, when the only other new car dealerships in D.C. moved to Maryland.
	Trailer	1932–present	As passenger base, with district flag used as separator in serial	T-12345	Current serial sequence began 1974 at T-101; serials became screened at around T-15500. Current highest serial seen: T-20013 (on May 8, 2020).
	WMATA Transit police		White with black lettering	12345	The Washington Metropolitan Area Transit Authority issues these to itself replacing standard passenger plates on WMATA-owned transit police cars. Some patrol cars now use commercial vehicle plates.

== Optional and organization license plates ==
Image	Type	Dates issued	Design	Serial format	Notes
	Passenger—low number		2001-2017: Annual plates; unique design each year. 2018-2019; 2022-2023: Plate valid for 2 years. 2020-2022: Plate valid for 2 years; renewed for third year with sticker.	1; 12; 123; 1234	Serials issued: 1 to 1250
	Alpha Kappa Alpha sorority			^{A}K_{A} 1234	
	Alpha Phi Alpha fraternity			^{A}P_{A} 1234	
	Anacostia River environmental protection			^{E}N_{V} 1234^{E}N_{V} 1^{E}N_{V} 12^{E}N_{V} 123	The original design, with 3 birds on the shore, was issued from ^{E}N_{V} 1001 to approximately ^{E}N_{V} 1089. The revised design, with 1 bird on the shore, was issued from ^{E}N_{V} 2001 to ^{E}N_{V}9999, then ^{E}N_{V} 1 to ^{E}N_{V} 999, and then ^{E}N_{V} 0001 to ^{E}N_{V} 0999.
	Bad Boys Club			^{B}B_{C} 1234	
	Bicentennial	1991-2001		200-ABC	Personalized, Disabled American Veteran, and personalized disabled person also available.
	Blue Knights			^{B}K_{I} 1234	
	Breast Cancer Awareness			^{B}C_{A} 1^{B}C_{A} 12^{B}C_{A} 123	
	The Children First Foundation	October 23, 2013–present		^{C}F_{F} 1234	
	College of William and Mary			^{C}W_{M} 1234	
	D.C. Firefighters Local 36			^{F}F_{A} 1234	
	Delta Sigma Theta sorority			^{D}S_{T} 1234	
	Disabled American Veteran			DAV123; DAV 123; DAV-1234	
	Disabled American Veteran—Disabled			♿DAV 123; DV♿-1234; DV♿-123	
	Donate Life			^{O}E_{T} 1234	
	Florida A&M University			^{F}A_{M} 1234	
	Fraternal Order of Police District of Columbia Lodge			^{F}O_{P} 123^{F}O_{P} 1234	
	George Washington University			^{G}W_{U} 1234	
	Howard University Alumni			^{H}U_{A} 1234	
	Kappa Alpha Psi fraternity			^{K}A_{P} 1234	
	Mississippi State University			^{M}S_{U} 1234	
	Morehouse College Alumni			^{M}C_{A} 1234	
	National Association of Black Scuba Divers			^{U}A_{S} 1234	
	Norfolk State University			^{N}S_{U} 1234	
	North Carolina Agricultural and Technical State University Alumni			^{A}T_{U} 1234	
	Omega Psi Phi fraternity			^{Q}U_{E} 1234	
	Personalized		"DISTRICT OF COLUMBIA" and "www.washingtondc.gov" legends.		
	Porsche Club of America			^{P}C_{A} 1234	
	Prince Hall Family (Order of the Eastern Star)			^{O}E_{S} 1234	
	Prince Hall Masonic Family			^{P}H_{A} 1234	
	Proud DC Veteran			^{O}V_{A} 1234	
	Purple Heart Veteran			^{P}_{H}-1234	
	St. John's College			^{S}J_{C} 1234	
	Southern Methodist University			^{S}M_{U} 1234	
	Spirit of Faith Christian Center			^{S}O_{F} 1234	
	Strong Woman Veteran			^{P}R_{D} 1234	First observed March 2021.
	University of Michigan			^{U}M_{I} 1234	
	University of Mississippi			^{U}M_{S} 1234	
	United States Air Force Veteran			^{A}I_{R} 1	First issued November 10, 2021.
	United States Army Veteran			^{A}R_{M} 1	First issued November 10, 2021.
	United States Coast Guard Veteran			^{C}O_{A} 1	First issued November 10, 2021.
	United States Marine Veteran			^{M}A_{R} 1^{M}A_{R} 12	First issued November 10, 2021.
	United States Navy Veteran			^{N}A_{V} 1	First issued November 10, 2021.
	Veterans of Foreign Wars			^{V}F_{W} 1234	
	Washington Capitals	February 2022–present	Two designs: WASHINGTON CAPITALS began at CAP 0000; 2018 STANLEY CUP CHAMPIONS began at CAP 0500.	^{C}A_{P} 1234	
	Washington Nationals	June 2013–present		^{N}A_{T} 123	
	White Stars			unknown	Probably never issued.

== Special event plates ==
=== Presidential inaugurations ===
Image	Type	Dates issued	Design	Serial format	Notes
	Inauguration of John F. Kennedy	1961	Capitol dome and national flag at left	1234	
	Second inauguration of Lyndon B. Johnson	1965	Red band at top; blue band at bottom; national and district flags at left	1234	
	First inauguration of Richard Nixon	1969	Red band at top; blue band at bottom; national flag over the White House at left	1234	
	Second inauguration of Richard Nixon	1973	Capitol dome and national flag at left, as in 1961	1234	
	Inauguration of Jimmy Carter	1977	Abstract national flag graphic at left	12345	
	First inauguration of Ronald Reagan	1981	Red band at top; blue band at bottom; national flag at left	1234; A-123	

=== Mayoral inaugurations ===
Image	Type	Dates issued	Design	Serial format	Notes
	First inauguration of Marion Barry	1983	Red band at top; blue band at bottom; district flag at left	123	
	Second inauguration of Marion Barry	1987	Similar to 1983	I-123	
	Inauguration of Sharon Pratt	1991	Red with stylized district flag at left	123	
	Third inauguration of Marion Barry	1995	Green with district flag at left and district outline at right	I-123	
	First inauguration of Anthony A. Williams	1999	Blue band at top containing "OUR CITY", district flag and "OUR FUTURE"; red band at bottom	123	

== Political types ==
Image	Type	Dates issued	Design	Serial format	Notes
	Board of Education	c. 1979–present		WARD 1	
	District Council	c. 2007		WARD 1	Most plates say "DC COUNCIL"; some say "DISTRICT COUNCIL"
	Delegate to the U.S. House of Representatives	c. 1984		CONGRESS-1	

== See also ==
- Federal government plates
- Diplomatic plates in the United States
